= List of canceled launch vehicle designs =

Even before the launch of Sputnik 1, there were various types of launch vehicle designs. The launch vehicle designs described below are either canceled or never left the drawing board.

== 20th century ==
Name	Designer	Proposed	Canceled
Von Braun ferry rocket	Wernher von Braun	1950s	
North American X-15B	USAF and NACA	1950s	1958
Mercury-Jupiter	NASA	1950s	1959
Saturn C-2	NASA	1959	1962
Saturn C-3	NASA	1959	1962
Saturn C-4	NASA	1959	1962
Nova	NASA	1959	
BAC Mustard	BAC	1960s	1967
NEXUS	General Dynamics	1960s	
Saturn C-5N	NASA	1960s	1972
Saturn INT-20	NASA	1960s	
UR-700	Vladimir Chelomei	1960s	
Saenger (spacecraft)	Eugen Sänger, Junkers, MBB, DLR	1960s	1995
Saturn C-8	NASA	1962	1962
Sea Dragon	Robert Truax	1962	
Douglas SASSTO	Philip Bono	1967	
Martin Marietta Spacemaster	Martin Marietta	1967	
Saturn V-A	NASA	1968	
Saturn V-C	NASA	1968	
Saturn V-Centaur	NASA	1968	
Saturn V-D	NASA	1968	
Saturn INT-21	NASA	1970s	
Chrysler SERV	Chrysler	1971	
Saturn-Shuttle	NASA	1971	1972
Hermes	CNES and ESA	1975	1992
Rockwell X-30	Rockwell International	1980	1993
British Aerospace HOTOL	British Aerospace and Rolls-Royce	1982	1989
Trans Atmospheric Vehicle	Lockheed Martin	~1985	
Shuttle-C	NASA	1984	1995
VentureStar	Lockheed Martin	1990s	2001
National Launch System	NASA	1991	1992
Black Horse	Mitchell Burnside Clapp	1993	1996
Kankoh-maru	Japanese Rocket Society	1993	
K-1	Rocketplane Kistler	1994	2007
Roton	Rotary Rocket	1996	2001
Magnum	NASA	1996	2004

== 21st century ==
Name	Designer	Proposed	Canceled
Ares IV	NASA	2000s	2010
Ares V Lite	NASA	2000s	2010
Jupiter	DIRECT	2000s	2010
Falcon 1e	SpaceX	2000s	2011
Haas	ARCAspace	2000s	
Orbital Space Plane Program	NASA	2002	2004
Falcon 5	SpaceX	2003	2005
Galaxy Express	Galaxy Express Corporation	2003	2009
Ares I	NASA	2005	2010
Ares V	NASA	2005	2010
Rocketplane XP	Rocketplane Kistler	2005	2011
Shuttle-Derived Heavy Lift Launch Vehicle	NASA	2009	2010
Liberty	ATK and Astrium	2011	2012
Falcon 9 Air	SpaceX	2011	2012
Mars Colonial Transporter	SpaceX	2012	2016
Interplanetary Transport System	SpaceX	2016	2017
Big Falcon Rocket	SpaceX	2017	2018
OmegA	Northrop Grumman	2016	2020

== See also ==
- Comparison of orbital launch systems
- Non-rocket spacelaunch
- List of orbital launch systems
- List of private spaceflight companies#Crew and cargo transport vehicles
- Spaceplane
- List of crewed lunar lander designs
