= Saturn V-Centaur =

Studied by Marshall Space Flight Center in 1968, the Saturn V-Centaur booster would have been used for deep space missions if it had flown. It consisted of an ordinary Saturn V launch vehicle, except that the Apollo spacecraft would be replaced with a Centaur upper stage (known as the S-V in the plans), as a high-energy liquid-fueled fourth stage, which would provide a 30% performance improvement over Saturn V-A/Saturn INT-20. This combination never flew.

== History ==
The Centaur upper stage was initially a proposal by the United States Air Force (USAF) which was accepted by the Advanced Research Products Agency (ARPA, who would later go on to be renamed as DARPA in 1972) in August 1958 as a way to respond to the USSR's successful Sputnik 1 mission the year before by ramping up their launch capabilities. The proposal, studied by the USAF with General Dynamics/Convair had the intention to develop a new high energy rocket stage to launch heavy payloads in the shortest possible time. It would use either one or two RL10 liquid hydrogen and liquid oxygen engines, with a specific impulse of 425 seconds, and would operate as the upper stage of the Atlas and Titan rockets.

In the same year, NASA took control of the Centaur program and designated it for use as the third stage of the Saturn 1 rocket with the designation S-V. However, it only every carried water as a test for Project Highwater and was never active nor carried propellant. Centaur was only ever present on the SA-2, SA-3, and SA-4 missions. It never flew on a Saturn again.

According to a 1959 report on Saturn development, the vehicle A-1 configuration, which has a modified Titan stage 1 and a Centaur upper stage as upper stages, was considered due to have early flight availability and low costs. How, it fails to meet the mission requirements for lunar and 24 hour missions. The slender 3.05m diameter would also have made the A-1 a structurally marginal configuration. The success of the Centaur engine program did encourage the addition of liquid hydrogen to the upper stages of the Saturn launch vehicle.
