= F1 engine =

F1 Engine may refer to:

- Rocketdyne F-1, a type of gas-generator cycle rocket engine
- The engine of a Formula One racing car
