= Apollo 4 =

First test flight of the Apollo Saturn V rocket

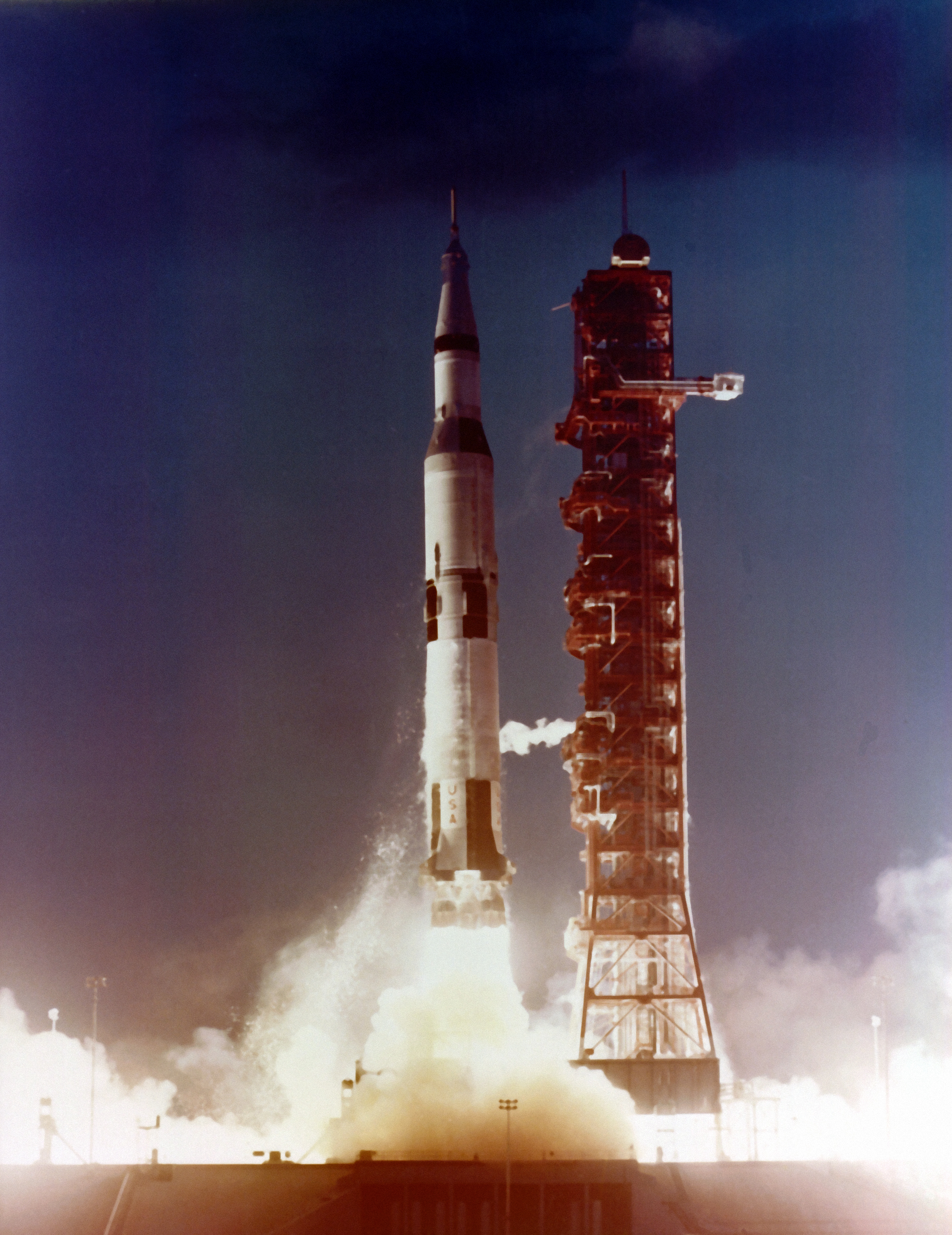
- The first flight of a Saturn V launch vehicle
- Mission type: Uncrewed Earth orbital CSM flight (A)
- Operator: NASA
- COSPAR ID: 1967-113A (command and service modules); 1967-113B (S-IVB)
- SATCAT no.: 3032
- Mission duration: 8 hours, 36 minutes, 59 seconds
- Orbits completed: 3

Spacecraft properties
- Spacecraft: Apollo CSM-017; Apollo LTA-10R
- Manufacturer: North American Rockwell
- Launch mass: 36,856 kilograms (81,253 lb)

Start of mission
- Launch date: November 9, 1967, 12:00:01 UTC
- Rocket: Saturn V SA-501
- Launch site: Kennedy LC-39A

End of mission
- Recovered by: USS Bennington
- Landing date: November 9, 1967, 20:37:00 UTC
- Landing site: North Pacific Ocean; 30°06′N 172°32′W

Orbital parameters
- Reference system: Geocentric
- Regime: Highly elliptical orbit
- Perigee altitude: −204 kilometers (−110 nmi)
- Apogee altitude: 18,092 kilometers (9,769 nmi)
- Inclination: 31.9 degrees
- Period: 314.58 minutes (initial)
- Epoch: November 9, 1967

Apollo 4 (November 9, 1967), also known as SA-501, was the uncrewed first test flight of the Saturn V launch vehicle, the rocket that eventually took astronauts to the Moon. The space vehicle was assembled in the Vehicle Assembly Building, and was the first to be launched from Kennedy Space Center (KSC) in Florida, ascending from Launch Complex 39, where facilities built especially for the Saturn V had been constructed.

Apollo 4 was an "all-up" test, meaning all rocket stages and spacecraft were fully functional on the initial flight, a first for NASA. It was the first time the S-IC first stage and S-II second stage flew. It also demonstrated the S-IVB third stage's first in-flight restart. The mission used a Block I command and service module modified to test several key Block II revisions, including its heat shield at simulated lunar-return velocity and angle.

The launch was planned for early 1967, but delayed to November 9 because of problems with various elements of the spacecraft and difficulties during pre-flight testing. Additional inspections were also required after a fire killed the Apollo 1 crew in January 1967.

The mission splashed down in the Pacific Ocean slightly less than nine hours after launch, having achieved its objectives. NASA considered the mission a complete success, proving that the Saturn V worked, an important step towards achieving the main objective of landing astronauts on the Moon, and bringing them back safely, before the end of the 1960s.

== Background ==
In 1961 U.S. President John F. Kennedy proposed that his nation land an astronaut on the Moon by the end of the decade, with a safe return to Earth. One of the early choices that had to be made to accomplish this goal was what launch vehicle to use. NASA decided on the Saturn C-5 rocket, a three-stage launch vehicle based on rockets already in development. In 1962 this was approved by NASA, which contemplated an initial test launch in 1965 and a first crewed flight by 1967, leaving plenty of time to accomplish Kennedy's goal. In early 1963, NASA redesignated the C-5 as the Saturn V.

After considerable debate within NASA, it was decided in late 1962 that lunar missions would have a "lunar orbit rendezvous" mode whereby the complete Apollo spacecraft would be propelled towards lunar orbit by the third stage of the launch vehicle, the S-IVB. Once in lunar orbit, the astronauts who would land would enter what was then known as the Lunar Excursion Module, which would separate from the rest of the spacecraft, land, and after taking off again be discarded once the crew had transferred back. The remainder of the vehicle would then return to Earth. The launch facilities under development would not be sufficient for the new launch vehicle, and in 1962, NASA announced plans for a new complex on the Florida coast from which the Apollo lunar missions could be launched. This was dubbed the Launch Operations Center, but after Kennedy's assassination in November 1963 was renamed the John F. Kennedy Space Center (KSC). Apollo 4 was the first flight from KSC, and the first using Launch Complex 39 (LC-39) there, built to accommodate the Saturn V.

The first three flights carrying Apollo equipment were launched using Saturn IBs. This smaller launch vehicle did not use the facilities at KSC, but issues resolved by Saturn IB flights would be valid for those to be launched by the Saturn V. Both the Saturn IB and the Saturn V would use a S-IVB, though the IB would use it as its second, final stage, rather than the third stage as on the Saturn V. Thus, many of the flight qualifications for the payload the Saturn V would carry could be resolved without having to expend one of the large launch vehicles. In addition to flight-qualifying the hardware, it was necessary to prove that the ground systems at KSC could successfully launch a Saturn V before risking the lives of astronauts on one.

Three Saturn IB launches (in order of launch, AS-201, AS-203 and AS-202) took place in 1966; all were successful. According to Charles D. Benson and William B. Flaherty in their history of KSC, "The Apollo-Saturn IB launches of 1966 represented important gains for NASA's launch team. LC-34 and LC-37, testbeds for automated checkout, were found wanting. In the twenty months between AS-201 and SA-501 [Apollo 4], KSC corrected the major automation problems. Without these trial and error advances, SA-501, the toughest launch in Apollo's history, would have been far more difficult."

== Delays ==
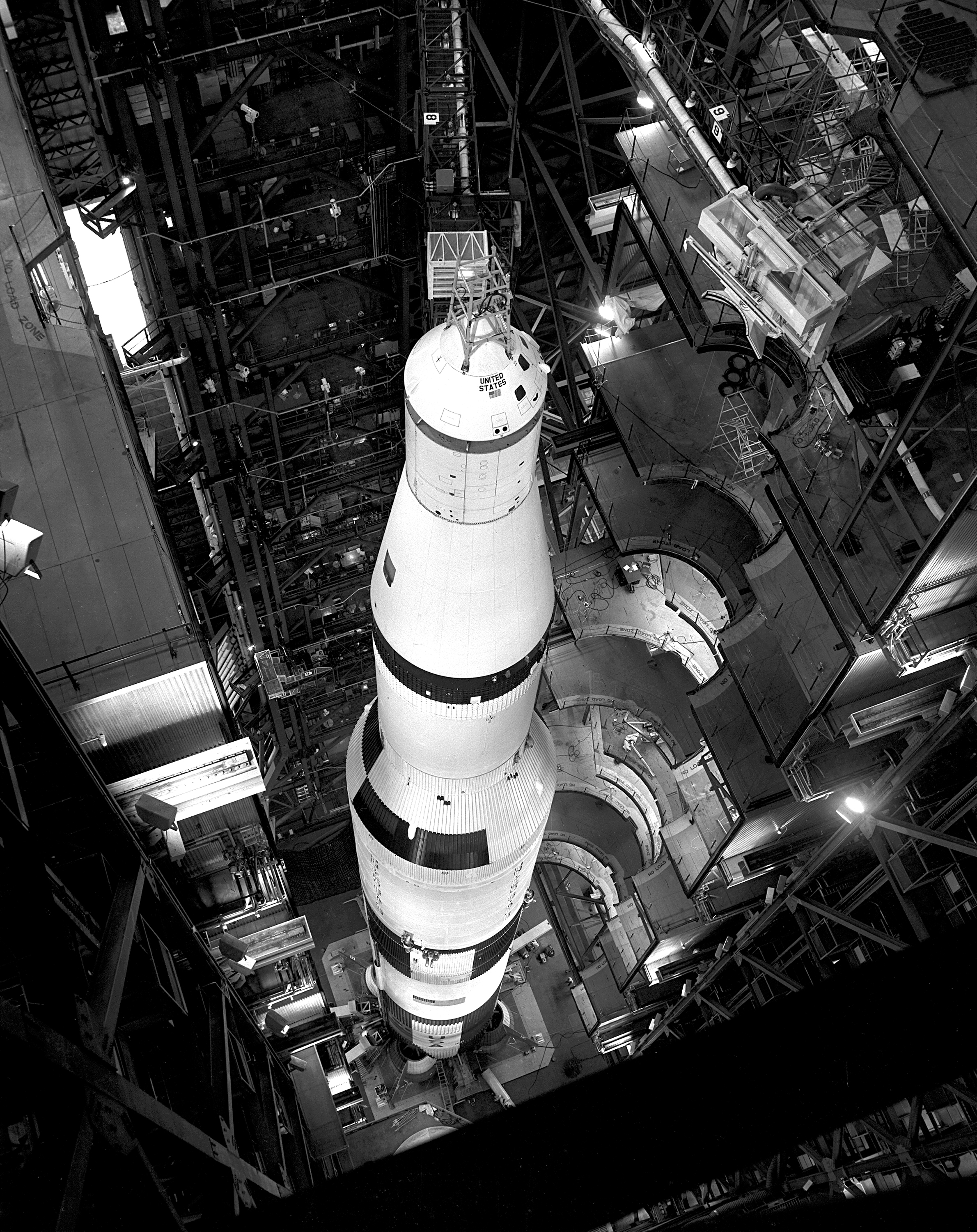
Apollo 4 inside the VAB

In January 1965 Major General Samuel C. Phillips, the Apollo Program Director, scheduled SA-501, the first test flight of the Saturn V, for January 1967. This left little spare time for delay, especially since two additional Saturn V launches were planned to follow in 1967. Many Apollo officials lacked confidence in the proposed launch date, and these misgivings proved accurate. After an explosion involving a liquid oxygen line flowing to LC-39, from which SA-501 was to be launched, there was a potential for a delay of several weeks.

North American Aviation was the contractor for both the S-II Saturn V second stage, and the Apollo command and service module (CSM) spacecraft. NASA had been experiencing problems with North American's schedule, cost, and quality performance on both programs, severe enough that Phillips led a team to North American's facility in California in November and December 1965 to investigate matters, and recommend solutions to the program management problems. He published his findings in a report to his supervisor, George Mueller. Technicians found cracks in the S-II, delaying its test firings prior to acceptance by NASA. As North American worked to fix the S-II, parts of the rocket began to arrive at KSC, beginning with the S-IVB on August 14, 1966, (by Pregnant Guppy aircraft) and followed closely by the first stage S-IC on September 12 (by barge). A spool-shaped "spacer" that took the place of the S-II allowed NASA to stack the vehicle as its checkout proceeded in the Vehicle Assembly Building (VAB). With the S-II still not arrived by November 1966 (it had originally been planned for July), NASA planned January 1967 for its arrival, with launch three months later. The CSM arrived on December 24, 1966, with the S-II arriving on January 21, 1967. Last to arrive was the aft interstage (the structure between the first and second stages), on January 31.

The Apollo 1 fire on January 27, 1967, which killed three astronauts during a launch pad test, threw NASA's schedules into further question – even though SA-501 was uncrewed, NASA officials wanted to closely examine its CSM. NASA had planned to restack the vehicle once this was done, but instead the inspections that took place found a total of 1,407 errors in the spacecraft. Inspectors found many haphazardly routed and skinned wires, prime material for short circuits.

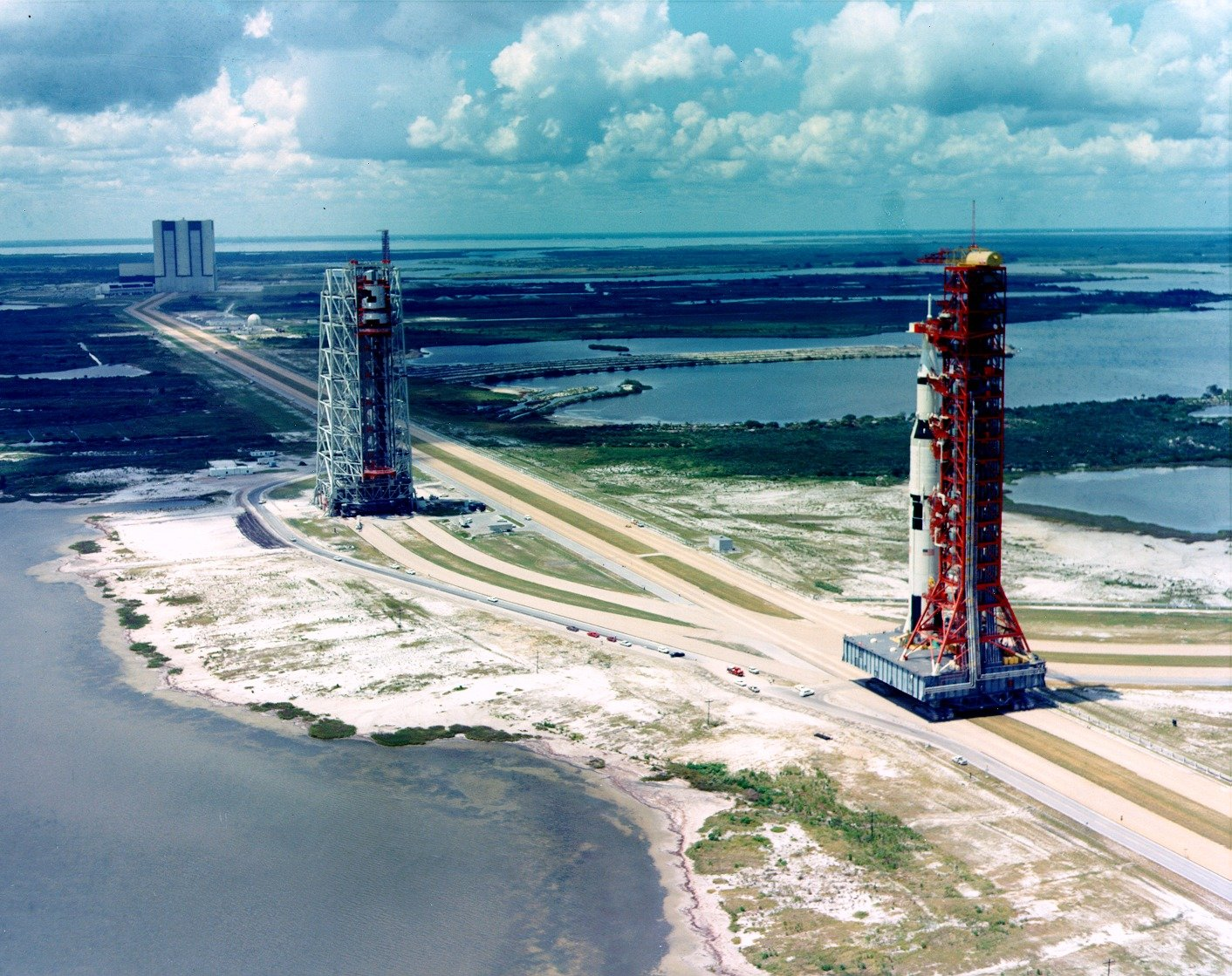
The Apollo 4 launch vehicle (right) is rolled out from the Vehicle Assembly Building (far left) past the Mobile Servicing Structure.

Other problems were discovered, such as an extra, out-of-place bolt in one of the J-2 engines; NASA was concerned not only with retrieving the surplus hardware, but also with discovering how it got there. A meeting in March 1967, with Phillips in attendance, disclosed twelve hundred problems with the Saturn V, which the technicians proposed to deal with at the rate of eighty per day. While the CSM was undergoing repairs, the spacer was removed from the vehicle stack, and the S-II positioned. On May 24 it was announced that the S-II would be removed for inspection following the discovery of hairline cracks in another S-II then being constructed, this work being completed by mid-June, after which the CSM was also returned to the stack, the first time the launch vehicle and spacecraft had been fully assembled. It was rolled out to LC-39 on August 26, 1967, where it was joined by the Mobile Servicing Structure that allowed access to the launch vehicle and spacecraft two days later, also transported by crawler. This was the first time a NASA spacecraft had been assembled away from its launch site, something allowing protection from Florida's hot and humid climate for equipment and personnel.

The countdown demonstration test had been scheduled for September 20 but was soon rescheduled for the 25th and did not begin until the evening of the 27th. By October 2 another two days had been lost to delays, but by October 4 it reached launch minus 45 minutes. Then a computer failed, and the count, reset to minus 13 hours before launch, resumed on October 9. More computer and equipment problems appeared. By then, the launch team was exhausted and a two-day break was declared. The test was completed on October 13, meaning that it took three weeks rather than the expectation of a week or slightly over. With world attention on the launch, NASA public relations head Julian Scheer brought the skeptical questions from the media as to whether Apollo 4 would ever fly to the attention of NASA Administrator James E. Webb, leading to a heated meeting in which Webb said he would announce the launch date when he wanted to.

These difficulties provided the launch crew with valuable experience, but meant that Apollo 4 could not be launched at the earliest until November 7. A flight readiness review on October 19 cleared Apollo 4 for launch, assuming the remaining tests and modifications were satisfactorily completed. Concerned about the potential for leaks in the Teflon seal rings and drain valves of the liquid oxygen tanks on board the vehicle due to the long time it had been sitting on the launch pad in the Florida sun, on November 2 Phillips postponed the launch until November 9.

== Objectives ==
The purpose of Apollo 4 (together with the Saturn V's other uncrewed test flight, Apollo 6) was to qualify the launch vehicle, the Apollo spacecraft, and the ground systems, for the crewed lunar landing missions that would follow. Being the first flight of the Saturn V, Apollo 4 marked the first flight for two of its stages: the S-IC first stage and the S-II second stage (the S-IVB had flown as the second stage of the Saturn IB).

Objectives for the Apollo 4 mission were to gain flight data on the Saturn V and spacecraft structural integrity and mutual compatibility, including on flight loads and during the separations as each Saturn V stage was exhausted and was discarded. NASA also wanted data on subsystem operations, including the emergency detection subsystem, and sought to evaluate the Apollo CM's heat shield under conditions simulating a return from a lunar mission. NASA was also seeking to test the restart capability of the S-IVB in space. These objectives would all be achieved.

== Equipment ==
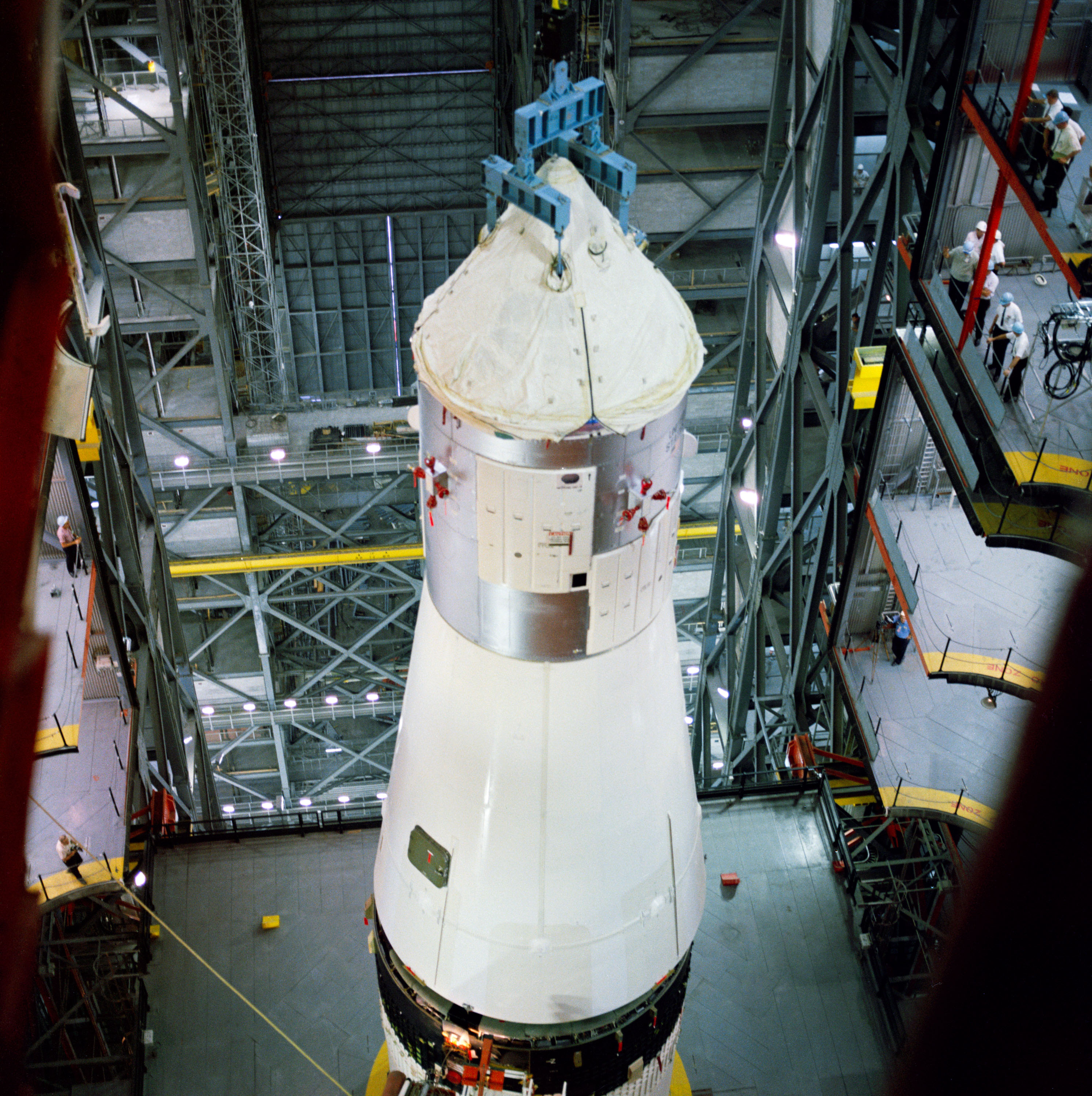
CSM-017 is moved into position.

Apollo 4 carried CSM-017, a Block I design of the command and service modules meant for testing and for Apollo's early Earth orbit flights. Unlike the Block II spacecraft which would go to the Moon, it lacked the capability to dock with a lunar module (LM). CSM-017 was made up of command module CM-017 and service module SM-020. CM-017 was the second fully-functional CM to be delivered to NASA; the first, CM-012, was designated for Apollo 1, and was severely damaged in the fire. SM-020 was originally to be used in CSM-020, slated for the second Saturn V test, but this changed after SM-017, which was intended to be part of CSM-017, was damaged in an explosion and was scrapped.

Several significant Block II modifications were made to CSM-017 for certification purposes, since no Block II spacecraft would fly without a crew. These included upgrading the heat shield to Block II standards, using a Block II CM-to-SM umbilical connector, and installing Block II-style VHF and S-band antennae. Additionally, there were modifications to the CM's hatch. The fact that the spacecraft hatch could not be readily opened in case of emergency had trapped the Apollo 1 astronauts in the fire that took their lives, and led to a redesign of the hatch. The new hatch was not scheduled to fly until the second Saturn V test (Apollo 6), but its seals were to be flight-qualified on Apollo 4 – the hatch window was replaced with a test panel simulating the seals and exterior heat shield. The heat shield was upgraded to Block II standards since Apollo 4's high-speed re-entry into Earth's atmosphere was intended to simulate a return from the Moon. Special equipment had been installed to allow Mission Control to operate the CSM's systems remotely, and there was a camera that would automatically take pictures out of one of the CM's windows on its final orbit. Since Apollo 4 carried no crew the CM lacked couches, controls and displays.

A Lunar Module Test Article, LTA-10R, was carried, and remained inside the Spacecraft–LM Adapter, numbered as SLA-8, on the third stage of the Saturn V throughout its flight. The LTA consisted of a flight-type descent stage lacking landing gear, with its fuel and oxidizer tanks containing a mixture of water, glycol, and freon. There was an ascent stage mockup atop it, made of aluminum with ballast, and having no flight systems. The SLA and LTA were instrumented to measure stress on them as the Saturn V made its way to orbit. LTA-10R would be destroyed when the S-IVB re-entered the atmosphere.

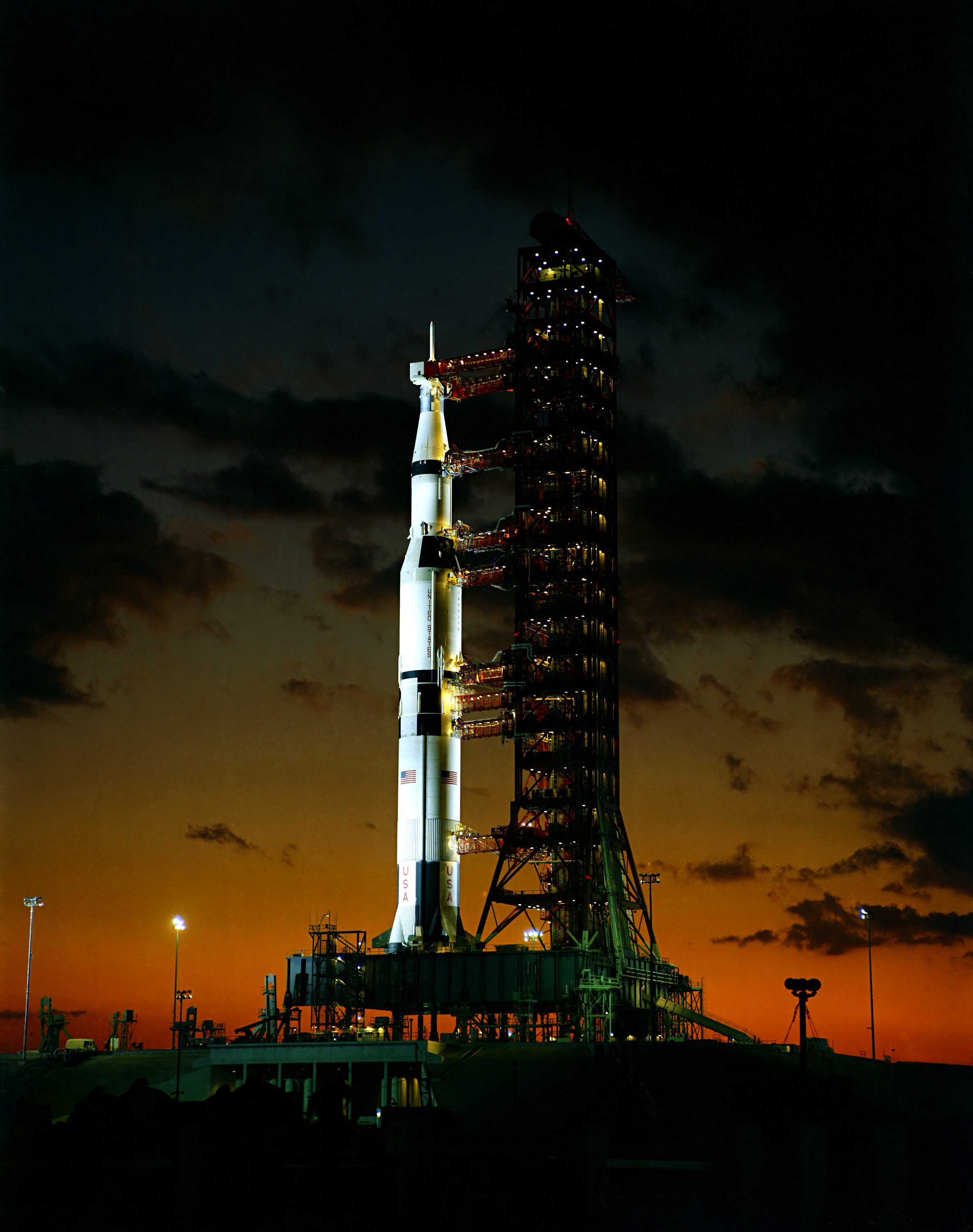
Apollo 4 on the launch pad

Apollo 4 was the first flight of a Saturn V. At the time, it was the largest launch vehicle to ever attempt a flight. This mission was the first time NASA used "all-up" testing, requiring that each stage of the launch vehicle work and that the vehicle carry a working spacecraft; a decision that goes back to late 1963. Mueller, the head of the NASA Office of Manned Space Flight at that time, was a systems engineer who previously worked on military missile projects. He had recognized that all-up testing was successfully used to rapidly develop the Air Force's Minuteman ICBM program, and thought it could be used to meet Apollo's schedule. In a 1963 memo he ordered that both the first Saturn IB flight and the first Saturn V flight be uncrewed, that each stage be fully functional, and that each carry a working spacecraft. The second flight of each type of rocket would also be an uncrewed test flight, and the third flight would be crewed. Previously, the way Wernher von Braun's team at the Marshall Space Flight Center tested new rockets was by testing each stage incrementally. The Saturn V would be tested all at once, with all stages live and fully flight-worthy, including an Apollo CSM. This decision dramatically streamlined the program's test flight phase, eliminating four missions, but it required everything to work properly the first time. Apollo program managers had misgivings about all-up testing but agreed to it with some reluctance since incremental component tests would inevitably push the lunar landing mission past the 1970 goal.

== Mission numbering ==
Apollo 4 was the first mission to fly under the official Apollo mission numbering scheme approved by Mueller on April 24, 1967; the planned first crewed flight, in preparation for which three astronauts had died, was retroactively designated Apollo 1 as the widows of the crew members had requested. Although three uncrewed Saturn IB flights had already occurred, only two had contained an Apollo spacecraft (AS-203 carried only the aerodynamic nose cone). Mueller resumed the numbering sequence at Apollo 4, without designating an Apollo 2 or 3.

== Public interest and media coverage ==
VIPs swarmed to KSC in the days before the launch. Von Braun arrived on November 6, scheduled for an exclusive executive dinner and conference that evening. NASA executives, figures from industry, Congressional leaders and diplomats also came for the launch. Each NASA center involved had a list of VIP guests, as did NASA headquarters in Washington, and duplications were sorted out so each center's director could invite guests personally. They watched the launch from uncovered bleachers near the VAB. NASA set up press headquarters in Cocoa Beach, where media representatives were accredited, and offered tours of KSC to visiting journalists, as well as a half-hourly shuttle service. NASA provided extensive telephone facilities for the media at the press site near LC-39, at their expense. KSC workers and their dependents watched the launch from near their work assignments. In addition, 43 employees of contractors who had performed in an exemplary manner were selected as "Manned Flight Awareness" honorees, given a VIP tour of KSC, a social evening in which six astronauts participated, and a view of the launch.

Apollo 4, being the first flight of the Saturn V, gained intense media coverage, and writers struggled to convey to the public the size of the launch vehicle, stating that it would tower well over the Statue of Liberty and be thirteen times as heavy. North American, in a handout to the media, noted that the 3000-ton Saturn V comfortably outweighed a "good-sized navy destroyer". On the day before launch, Mueller, Phillips, von Braun, Deputy Administrator Robert C. Seamans and Kennedy Space Center Director Kurt Debus held an outdoor press conference for more than a thousand journalists, including some from the Soviet Union, with the Saturn V in the background.

== Launch and flight ==
Our building's shaking! The roar is terrific! The building's shaking! This big glass window is shaking. We're holding it with our hands! Look at that rocket go! Into the clouds at 3,000 feet! The roar is terrific! Look at it going! You can see it. Part of our roof has come in here.

— Walter Cronkite, November 9, 1967

On November 6, 1967, at 10:30 pm EST (03:30 November 7 UTC), the 56 1/2-hour countdown sequence began with propellant loading. In total there were 89 trailer-truck loads of liquid oxygen, 28 trailer loads of LH2 (liquid hydrogen), and 27 rail cars of RP-1 (highly refined kerosene). This time the problems encountered were few and minor, and did not delay the launch due to the use of built-in holds in the countdown, during which time accumulated delays were made good.

Apollo 4 launched on November 9 at 7:00 am EST (noon UTC). Eight seconds before liftoff, the five F-1 engines ignited, sending tremendous amounts of noise across Kennedy Space Center. Even though the launch pads at LC-39 were more than five kilometers (three miles) from the Vehicle Assembly Building, the sound pressure was much stronger than expected and buffeted the VAB, Launch Control Center and press buildings. Dust was dislodged from the ceiling of the Launch Control Center and formed a layer on the consoles of mission controllers. William Donn of Columbia University described the blast as one of the loudest noises, natural or artificial, in human history, excepting nuclear explosions. CBS's commentator, Walter Cronkite, and producer Jeff Gralnick put their hands on their trailer's observation window to stop it from shattering as ceiling tiles fell from above. Cronkite found Apollo 4 to be the most frightening space mission he covered.

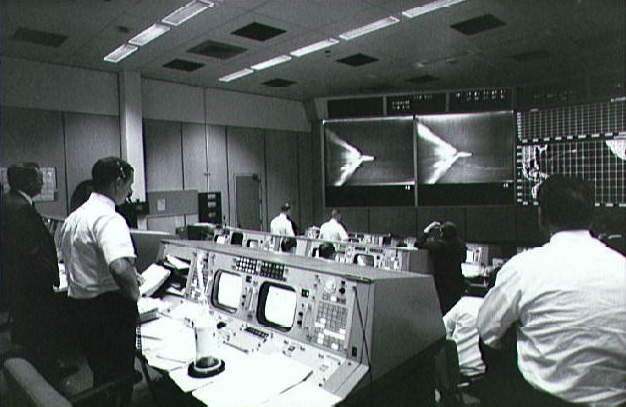
Mission controllers watch Apollo 4 climb to orbit.

The launch placed the S-IVB and CSM into a nearly circular 190-kilometer (100 nmi) orbit, a nominal parking orbit that would be used on the lunar missions. After two orbits, in a simulation of the trans-lunar injection burn that would take later Apollo missions towards the Moon, the S-IVB's first in-space re-ignition put the spacecraft into an elliptical orbit with an apogee of 17,218 kilometers (9,297 nmi) and a perigee deliberately aimed 84.6 kilometers (45.7 nmi) below the Earth's surface; this would ensure both a high-speed atmospheric re-entry of the command module, and destruction after re-entry of the S-IVB. Shortly after this burn, the CSM separated from the S-IVB and fired its service module engine to adjust the apogee to 18,092 kilometers (9,769 nmi). After passing apogee, the service module engine fired again for 281 seconds to increase re-entry speed to 11,168 meters per second (36,639 ft/s), at an altitude of 120 kilometers (400,000 ft) and a flight path angle of −6.93 degrees, simulating conditions on a return from the Moon.

The CM landed approximately 8.6 nautical miles (16 km) from the target landing site northwest of Midway Island in the North Pacific Ocean. Its descent was visible from the deck of the aircraft carrier USS Bennington, the prime recovery ship, which within two hours had recovered it and one of its parachutes, the first time an Apollo parachute had been recovered for inspection. The spacecraft was brought to Hawaii for deactivation, after which it was taken to North American's facility in Downey, California, for post-flight analysis.

== Onboard cameras ==
Two cameras captured the staging event; one clip is shown. The first stage falls away, followed by the interstage ring.

Two motion-picture cameras were aboard Apollo 4. These were mounted on the Saturn V so as to capture the separation of the first stage and interstage from the launch vehicle. They would then be ejected, descend to the Atlantic Ocean in pods with parachutes and radio beacons, and be recovered about 870 kilometers (470 nmi) downrange of KSC.

The command module contained an automatic 70 mm film camera which captured photographs of almost the entire Earth. For a period of two hours and thirteen minutes as the craft approached and passed its apogee, a total of 755 color images were taken through the Command Pilot's (left-hand) forward-looking window, at altitudes ranging from 13,510 to 18,092 kilometers (7,295 to 9,769 nmi). These were the color images taken from the highest altitude at that time. The photographs were not of sufficient resolution to obtain detailed scientific data, but were still of interest to those involved in the Earth sciences.

== Aftermath, assessment and spacecraft location ==
Technically, managerially, and psychologically, Apollo 4 was an important and successful mission, especially in view of the number of firsts it tackled. It was the first flight of the first and second stages of the Saturn V (the S-IVB stage had flown on the Saturn IB launch vehicles), the first launch of the complete Saturn V, the first restart of the S-IVB in orbital flight, the first liftoff from Complex 39, the first flight test of the Block II command module heatshield, the first flight of even a simulated lunar module, and so on. The fact that everything worked so well and with so little trouble gave NASA a confident feeling, as Phillips phrased it, that "Apollo [was] on the way to the moon."

— Courtney G. Brooks, James M. Grimwood and Loyd S. Swenson, Chariots for Apollo: A History of Manned Lunar Spacecraft (1979)

All Apollo 4 launch vehicle and spacecraft systems performed satisfactorily. On the climb to orbit, each of the Saturn V's three stages burned for slightly longer than expected. This left the craft in an orbit roughly one kilometer higher than expected, something well within tolerance. A burn eleven seconds longer than planned meant that the CM entered the Earth's atmosphere slightly faster and at a shallower angle than planned, but still within tolerance. This discrepancy happened not because of the performance of the guidance system (which was exemplary), but because the burn had been controlled from Earth. The CM's environmental control system kept the ship's cabin within acceptable temperatures and pressures throughout the mission, increasing by only 5.6 °C (10 °F) during atmospheric entry.

President Lyndon Johnson described the launch, "The whole world could see the awesome sight of the first launch of what is now the largest rocket ever flown. This launching symbolizes the power this nation is harnessing for the peaceful exploration of space." Von Braun spoke of the mission as "an expert launching all the way through, from lift-off exactly on time to performance of every single stage". In his history of the Saturn V, Roger E. Bilstein wrote that "the flawless mission of Apollo 4 elated the entire NASA organization; everyone looked ahead with buoyant spirits." Mueller stated that Apollo 4 dramatically increased the confidence of many and showed it should be possible for astronauts to land on the Moon by mid-1969.

Earth photographed with the command module camera.

Apollo 6, the second flight of the Saturn V, was launched on April 4, 1968. Although the Saturn V's stages gave more trouble than on Apollo 4 (the mission experienced pogo oscillation during its first stage and had an early second-stage engine shutdown), it was decided that a third uncrewed flight was unnecessary. The Saturn V flew with a crew for the first time on Apollo 8. A Saturn V launched astronauts into space, and (except for Apollo 9) towards the Moon, on each of the Apollo missions that followed.

In January 1969 CM-017 was transferred to the Smithsonian Institution, and was exhibited for a year there. In January 1974, it was moved by truck from Andrews Air Force Base in Maryland to North Carolina for exhibit, displayed at the North Carolina Museum of Life and Science. In 1984, the Smithsonian required its return, stating that it was considering lending it out to other museums. The CM was subsequently put on public display at NASA's Stennis Space Center, where it remained until 2017. It is currently on display at Stennis Space Center's visitor center, the Infinity Science Center, in Pearlington, Mississippi.
