= Saturn V-A =

Saturn V-A was a proposed American orbital launch vehicle. It was studied by Marshall Space Flight Center in 1968. the Saturn V-A was identical to the Saturn INT-20, except it consisted of an ordinary S-IC first stage and S-IVB second stage. For deep-space missions, a Centaur third stage could also have been used.

== Details ==
Details of Saturn V-A:
Gross mass: 2,478,120 kg (5,463,310 lb).
Payload: 60,000 kg (132,000 lb).
Height: 72.00 m (236.00 ft).
Diameter: 10.06 m (33.00 ft).
Thrust: 33,737.90 kN (7,584,582 lbf).
Apogee: 185 km (114 mi).
