= Saturn-Shuttle =

Concept of launching the Space Shuttle orbiter using the Saturn V rocket

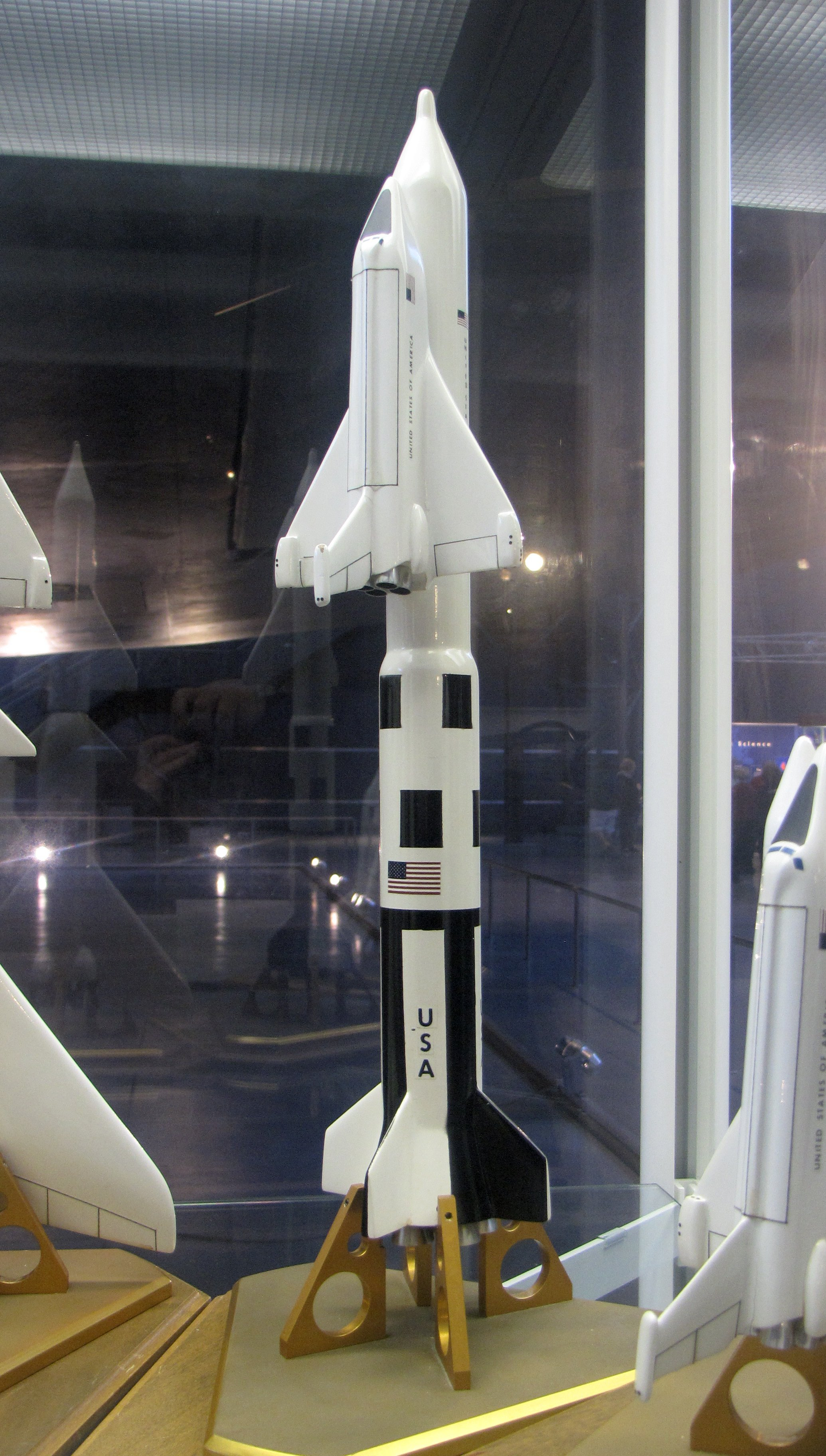
- NASA model of Saturn-Shuttle configuration
- Function: Crewed LEO launch vehicle
- Manufacturer: Boeing (S-IC); Martin Marietta (External Tank); Rockwell International (Space Shuttle orbiter)
- Country of origin: United States

Size
- Height: 86 m (281 ft)
- Diameter: 10 m (33 ft)
- Mass: 2,300,000 kg (5,070,000 lb)
- Stages: 2

Capacity

Payload to LEO
- Mass: 60,500 kg (133,400 lb)

Launch history
- Status: Canceled
- Launch sites: Kennedy LC-39

First stage – S-IC
- Height: 137.99 ft (42.06 m)
- Diameter: 33 ft (10 m)
- Empty mass: 298,104 lb (135,218 kg)
- Gross mass: 5,040,245 lb (2,286,217 kg)
- Powered by: 5 Rocketdyne F-1
- Maximum thrust: 8,700,816 lbf (38,703.16 kN)
- Specific impulse: 304 seconds (2.98 km/s)
- Burn time: 161 s
- Propellant: RP-1/LOX

Second stage – External Tank
- Height: 153.8 ft (46.9 m)
- Diameter: 27.5 ft (8.4 m)
- Empty mass: 65,980 lb (29,930 kg)
- Gross mass: 1,655,616 lb (750,975 kg)
- Specific impulse: 455 seconds (4.46 km/s)
- Burn time: 480 s
- Propellant: LH_{2} / LOX

Second stage – Orbiter plus External Tank
- Powered by: 3 SSMEs located on Orbiter
- Maximum thrust: 5,250 kN (1,180,000 lbf)
- Specific impulse: 455 seconds (4.46 km/s)
- Burn time: 480 s
- Propellant: LH_{2} / LOX

The Saturn-Shuttle was a preliminary concept of launching the Space Shuttle orbiter using a modified version of the first stage of the Saturn V rocket. It was studied and considered in 1971–1972.

== Description ==
An interstage would be fitted on top of the S-IC stage to support the external tank in the space occupied by the S-II stage in the Saturn V. It was an alternative to the SRBs.

Some studies proposed the addition of wings (and some form of landing gear) to the S-IC stage, which would allow the booster to fly back to the Kennedy Space Center, where technicians would then refurbish the booster for another flight, whether in its entirety or just the tankage.

The Shuttle would handle space station logistics, while the Saturn V would launch components. This would have allowed the International Space Station, using a Skylab or Mir configuration with both U.S. and Russian docking ports, to have been lifted with just a handful of launches. However, it was ultimately rejected on basis of cost.

== See also ==
- Buran programme
- Boeing X-20 Dyna-Soar
- X-37
- Dream Chaser
- List of launch vehicle designs
