= Saturn V-B =

American rocket concept

- Function: Crewed/uncrewed LEO and Lunar launch vehicle
- Country of origin: United States

Size
- Height: 50 m (164 ft)
- Diameter: 10 m (33 ft)
- Mass: 2,313,320 kg (5,099,990 lb)
- Stages: 1.5

Capacity

Payload to LEO
- Mass: 22,600 kg (49,800 lb)

Launch history
- Status: Concept/study
- Launch sites: Unknown
- Total launches: 0

Booster stage – S-ID
- Powered by: 5 Rocketdyne F-1
- Maximum thrust: 30,962.50 kN (6,960,647 lbf)
- Burn time: 154 s
- Propellant: RP-1/LOX

First stage – S-ID Sustainer
- Powered by: 1 Rocketdyne F-1
- Maximum thrust: 7,740.30 kN (1,740,089 lbf)
- Burn time: 315 s
- Propellant: RP-1/LOX

Studied in 1968 by Marshall Space Flight Center, the Saturn V-B was considered an interesting vehicle concept because it nearly represents a single-stage to orbit booster, but is actually a stage and a half booster just like the Atlas. The booster would achieve liftoff via five regular F-1 engines; four of the five engines on the Saturn V-B would be jettisoned and could be fully recoverable, with the sustainer stage on the rocket continuing the flight into orbit. The rocket could have had a good launch capability similar to that of the Space Shuttle if it was constructed, but it never flew.

== Concept ==
With use of the Saturn V vehicle during Apollo, NASA began considering plans for a hypothesized evolutionary Saturn V family concept that spans the earth orbital payload spectrum from 50,000 to over 500,000 lbs. The "B" derivative of the Saturn V was a stage and one- half version of the then current S-IC stage and would become the first stage in an effective and economical assembly of upper stages of the evolutionary Saturn family.

The booster would achieve liftoff via five regular F-1 engines; four of the five engines on the Saturn V-B would be jettisoned and could be fully recoverable, with the sustainer stage on the rocket continuing the flight into orbit. The vehicle would be capable of a LEO payload of 50,000 lb with a standard S-IC stage length of 138 ft. Increases in the length of the stage could significantly increase this capability.

== See also ==
- Saturn-Shuttle
