= Martin Marietta Spacemaster =

Space Shuttle proposal

Spacemaster
- Function: Manned Re-usable orbital launch vehicle
- Manufacturer: Martin Marietta
- Country of origin: United States

Size
- Height: 128 m (420 ft)
- Diameter: 8.0 m (26.2 ft)
- Mass: 1,600,000 kg (3,500,000 lb)
- Stages: 2

Capacity

Payload to LEO
- Mass: 22,700 kg (50,000 lb)

Launch history
- Status: Cancelled
- Launch sites: LC-39 Kennedy Space Center
- Total launches: 0

First stage
- Powered by: 14 Rocketdyne SSME
- Maximum thrust: 28,080 kN (6,310,000 lb_{f})
- Burn time: 155 seconds
- Propellant: LH2/LOX

Second stage
- Powered by: 2 Rocketdyne SSME
- Maximum thrust: 4,549 kN (1,023,000 lb_{f})
- Burn time: 276 seconds
- Propellant: LH2/LOX

The Martin Marietta Spacemaster was a proposed configuration for what became the Space Shuttle, which featured an X-24-derived orbiter, and an unusual "catamaran style" booster stage. During launch and ascent, the orbiter would be located in a recess in the booster. The booster's 14 engines would be located in clusters of seven, at the bottom of both halves of the booster. Unlike the final design for the Space Shuttle, the Spacemaster would lack an external tank, and the boosters would be joined, by means of connecting struts which would also serve as the mounting for the orbiter.

The concept was evaluated in 1967, but was rejected. Martin Marietta went on to produce the Space Shuttle external tank (ET) for the final STS Space Shuttle design (by Lockheed Martin after a merger with Lockheed).

A model of the Martin Marietta Spacemaster is in the collection of the Smithsonian National Air and Space Museum.

== See also ==
- List of space launch system designs
- Space Shuttle program
