= Saturn C-8 =

Proposed NASA super-heavy-lift launch vehicle

- Saturn C-8 Launch Vehicle
- Function: Manned lunar landing by direct ascent for Apollo program
- Manufacturer: None
- Country of origin: United States

Size
- Height: 430 ft (131 m)
- Diameter: 40 ft (12.2 m)
- Width: 75 ft (22.9 m)
- Mass: 10,516,620 lb (4,770,260 kg)
- Stages: 3

Capacity

Payload to LEO
- Mass: 460,000 lb (210,000 kg)

Payload to Translunar injection
- Mass: 163,000 lb (74,000 kg)

Associated rockets
- Family: Saturn

Launch history
- Status: Study 1962
- Launch sites: Kennedy Space Center

First stage – S-IC-8
- Height: 160 ft (48.8 m)
- Diameter: 40 ft (12.2 m)
- Width: 75 ft (22.9 m)
- Empty mass: 399,900 lb (181,400 kg)
- Gross mass: 7,997,200 lb (3,627,500 kg)
- Powered by: 8 F-1
- Maximum thrust: 13,921,000 lbf (61,925 kN)
- Specific impulse: 265 s (2.60 km/s) sl 304 s (2.98 km/s) vac
- Burn time: 157 seconds
- Propellant: RP-1 / LOX

Second stage – S-II-8
- Height: 140 ft (42.7 m)
- Diameter: 33 ft (10.1 m)
- Empty mass: 139,940 lb (63,480 kg)
- Gross mass: 1,699,400 lb (770,800 kg)
- Powered by: 8 J-2
- Maximum thrust: 1,858,100 lbf (8,265.26 kN)
- Specific impulse: 425 s (4.17 km/s) vac
- Burn time: 338 s
- Propellant: LH_{2} / LOX

Third stage – S-IVB
- Height: 61 ft 8 in (18.80 m)
- Diameter: 21 ft 8 in (6.60 m)
- Empty mass: 29,345 lb (13,311 kg)
- Gross mass: 264,370 lb (119,920 kg)
- Powered by: 1 Rocketdyne J-2
- Maximum thrust: 220,000 lbf (1,000 kN)
- Specific impulse: 425 s (4.17 km/s) vac
- Burn time: 165 + 335 seconds (2 burns for TLI)
- Propellant: LH_{2} / LOX

The Saturn C-8 was the largest member of the Saturn series of rockets to be designed. It was a potential alternative to the Nova rocket, should NASA have chosen a direct ascent method of lunar exploration for the Apollo program. The first stage (S-IC-8) was an increased-diameter version of the S-IC. The second stage (S-II-8) was an increased-diameter version of the S-II. Both of these stages had eight engines, as opposed to the standard five. The third stage was a stretched S-IVB stage, which retained its original diameter and engine.

NASA announced on September 7, 1961, that the government-owned Michoud Ordnance Plant near New Orleans, Louisiana, would be the site for fabrication and assembly of the Saturn first stages as well as larger vehicles in the Saturn program. Finalists were two government-owned plants in St. Louis and New Orleans. The height of the factory roof at Michoud meant that a 40-foot-diameter (12 m) launch vehicle with eight F-1 engines (Saturn C-8, Nova class) could not be built; four or five engines (33 ft or 10 m diameter) would have to be the maximum. This decision ended consideration of a Nova-class launch vehicle for direct ascent to the Moon or as heavy-lift derivatives for Earth orbit rendezvous. Ultimately, the lunar orbit rendezvous ("LOR") concept approved in 1962 rendered the C-8 obsolete, and the smaller Saturn C-5 was developed instead under the designation "Saturn V", as the LOR spacecraft was within its payload capacity.

The Saturn C-8 configuration was never taken further than the design process, as it was too large and costly.
