= Saturn V-D =

The Saturn V-D was a conceptual booster with the ability to launch three times as much payload as the Russian Energia booster. Studied in 1968, it was considered to be the mightiest of the proposed variations of the Saturn V rocket, rehashed as one of the boosters from the Boeing 1967 Saturn studies and utilizing the stage and a half Saturn V-B, four 100 ft tall SRBs, and the ordinary second and third stages of the original Saturn V. This booster never flew, but if it had been manufactured it would have had the capability to launch all the necessary components for a space station in one shot.
