= S-IC =

First stage of the Saturn V rocket

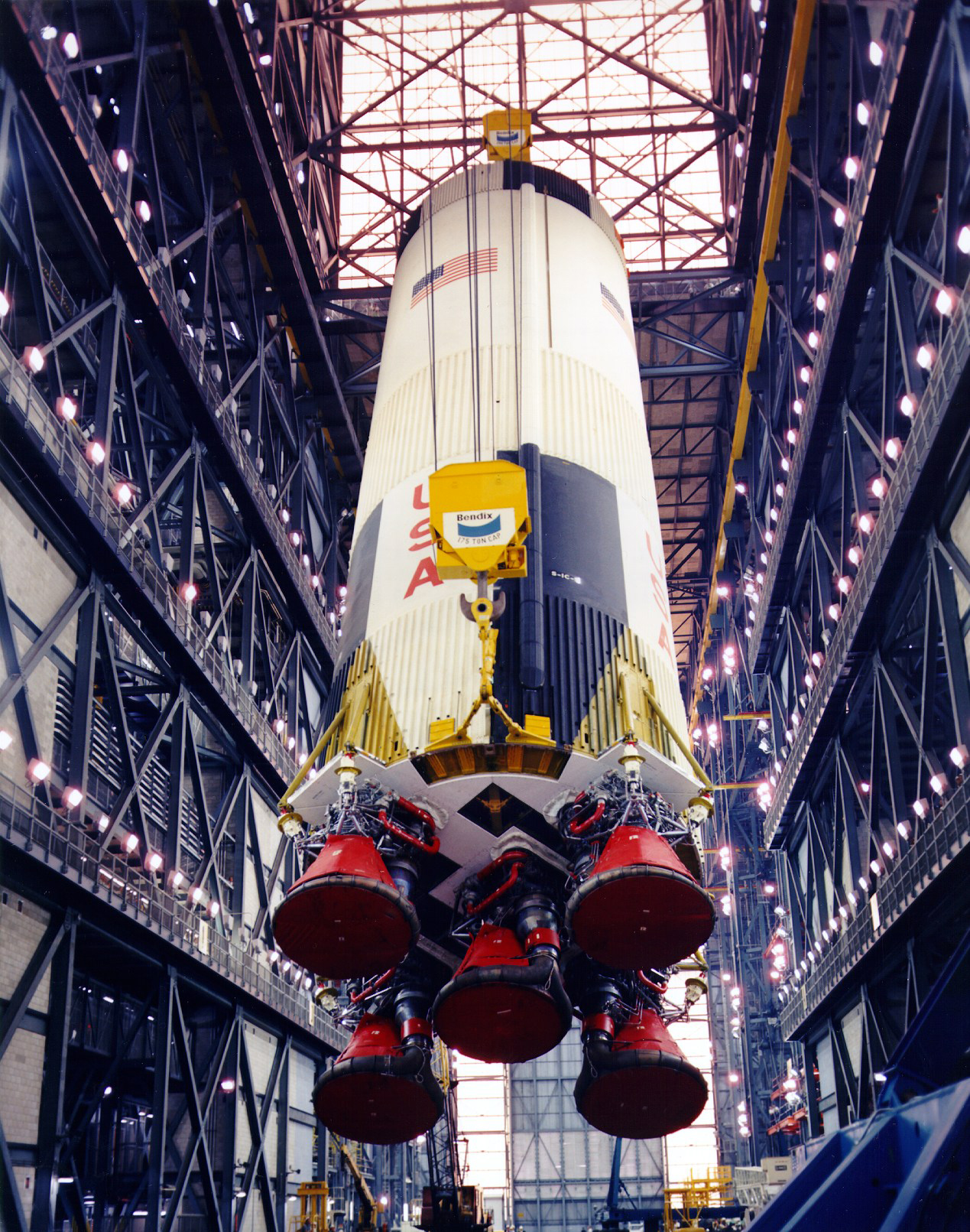
- The Apollo 10 S-IC stage is hoisted in the Vehicle Assembly Building for stacking
- Manufacturer: Boeing
- Country of origin: United States
- Used on: Saturn V

General characteristics
- Height: 42 m (138 ft)
- Diameter: 10 m (33 ft)
- Gross mass: 2,214 t (4,881,000 lb)
- Propellant mass: 2,077 t (4,578,000 lb)
- Empty mass: 137 t (303,000 lb)

Launch history
- Status: Retired
- Total launches: 13
- Successes (stage only): 13
- First flight: November 9, 1967 (Apollo 4)
- Last flight: May 14, 1973 (Skylab 1)

Engine details
- Powered by: 5 × F-1
- Maximum thrust: 34,500 kN (7,750,000 lbf) at sea level
- Specific impulse: 263 s (2.58 km/s)
- Burn time: 150 seconds
- Propellant: RP-1/LOX

The S-IC (pronounced S-one-C) was the first stage of the American Saturn V rocket. The S-IC stage was manufactured by the Boeing Company. Like the first stages of most rockets, more than 90% of the mass at launch was propellant, in this case RP-1 rocket fuel and liquid oxygen (LOX) oxidizer. It was 42 m (138 ft) tall and 10 m (33 ft) in diameter. The stage provided 34,500 kN (7,750,000 lbf) of thrust at sea level to get the rocket through the first 61 km (38 mi) of ascent. The stage had five F-1 engines in a quincunx arrangement. The center engine was fixed in position, while the four outer engines could be hydraulically gimballed to control the rocket.

== Manufacturing ==
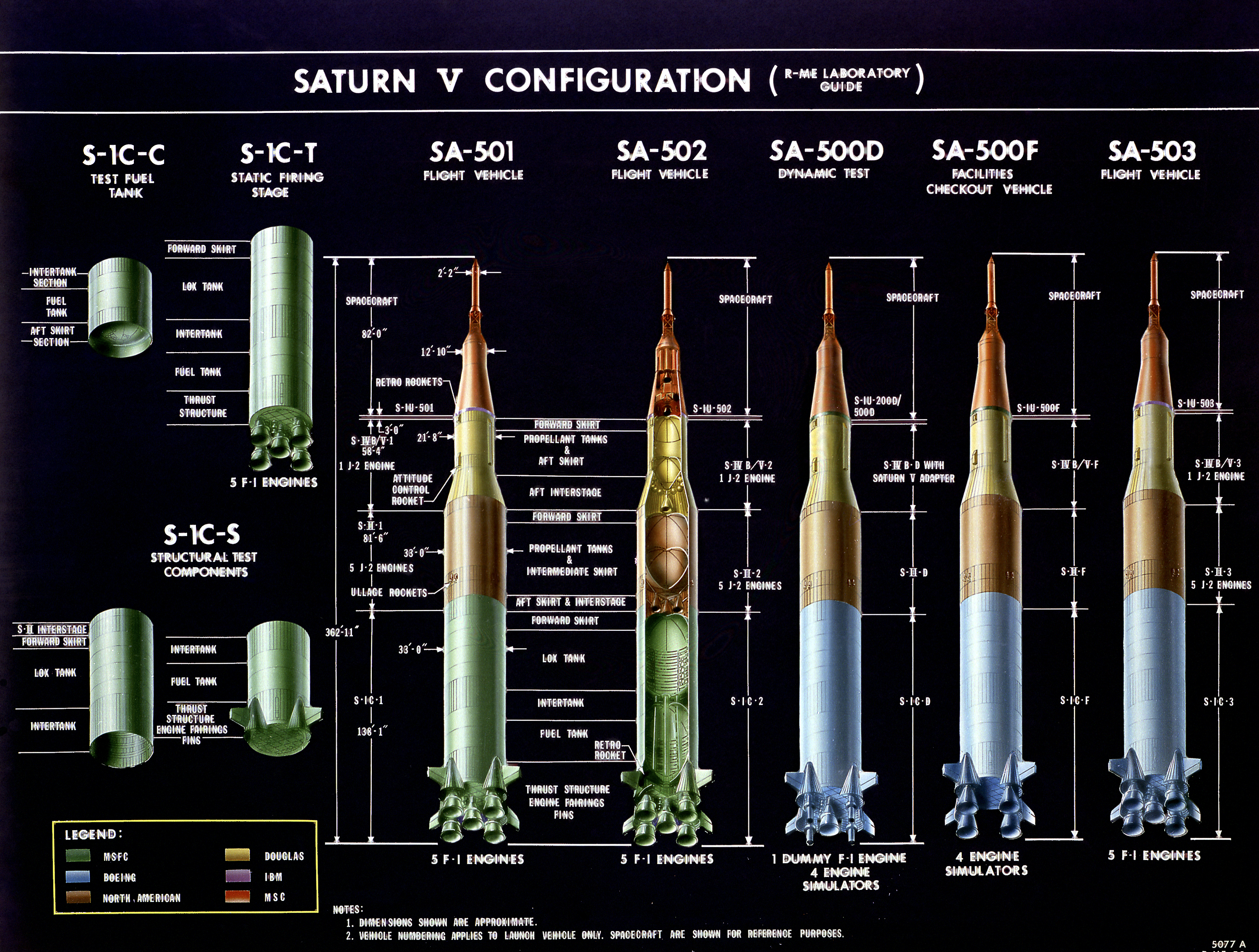
Saturn V configurations, including the S-IC-S, S-IC-C and S-IC-T test stages

The Boeing Co. was awarded the contract to manufacture the S-IC on December 15, 1961. By this time the general design of the stage had been decided on by the engineers at the Marshall Space Flight Center (MSFC). The main place of manufacture was the Michoud Assembly Facility, New Orleans. Wind tunnel testing took place in Seattle and the machining of the tools needed to build the stages at Wichita, Kansas.

MSFC built two test stages (S-IC-S, the structural test "stage" which actually consisted of the various stage subassemblies but which was never fully assembled into a complete stage, and S-IC-T, the static test stage) and the first two flight models (S-IC-1 and -2).

It took roughly seven to nine months to build the tanks and 14 months to complete a stage. The first stage built by Boeing was S-IC-D, a test model. Boeing also built an additional test stage, designated S-IC-F.

In addition to the four test stages, NASA ordered 15 flight stages (S-IC-1 through -15) to support the initial Apollo program. In July 1967, NASA awarded Boeing a contract to begin long-lead-time item acquisition (such as propellant lines and tank components) for the 16th and 17th S-IC stages. A full contract for the construction of S-IC-16 to S-IC-25 was drafted throughout mid-1967, but stages past S-IC-15 were canceled altogether in October of that year due to budgetary restrictions. S-IC-16 to -25 would have been utilized for follow-on Apollo missions, including those from the Apollo Applications Program.

== Design ==
The S-IC was composed of five major subsections.

The largest and heaviest single component of the S-IC was the thrust structure, with a mass of 48,000 pounds (22,000 kg). It was designed to support the thrust of the five engines and redistribute it evenly across the base of the rocket. There were four anchors that held down the rocket as it built thrust. These were among the largest aluminum forgings produced in the U.S. at the time, measuring 15 feet (4.6 m) long and weighing in at 1,800 pounds (820 kg). The four stabilizing fins withstood a temperature of 2,000 °F (1,100 °C).

The five F-1 engines were ignited in 3 staggered events, where the center engine was first ignited, followed by a diagonal pair of outer engines, and then the remaining two outer engines. These three ignition events were separated by just 300 milliseconds. This staggered ignition approach lessened the loads on the thrust structure, as an instantaneous ignition of all five engines would impart immense stress on the stage.

Above the thrust structure was the fuel tank, containing 209,000 US gallons (790 m^{3}; 27,900 ft^{3}) of RP-1 fuel. The tank itself had a mass of over 12 short tons (24,000 lb; 11,000 kg) dry and could release 1,300 US gallons per second (4,900 L/s). Nitrogen was bubbled through the tank before launch to keep the fuel mixed. During the flight the fuel was pressurized using helium, which was stored in tanks in the liquid oxygen tank above. Both the thrust structure and fuel tank had alternating black and white paint in order to monitor the vehicle's roll during flight.

Between the fuel and liquid oxygen tanks was the intertank. This contained propellant fill and drain lines for the liquid oxygen tank as well as a portion of the five liquid oxygen feed lines for the engines.

The liquid oxygen (LOX) tank held 334,500 US gallons (1,266 m^{3}; 44,720 ft^{3}). It raised special issues for the designer. The lines through which the LOX ran to the engine had to be straight (as any bend would slow the flow of LOX, which would necessitate even larger and heavier piping) and therefore had to pass through the fuel tank. This meant insulating these lines inside a tunnel to stop fuel freezing to the outside and also meant adding five extra holes in the top of the fuel tank.

Atop the liquid oxygen tank sat the forward skirt, which connected the S-IC to the S-II stage and contained telemetry equipment and LOX tank vent lines.

Two solid motor retrorockets were located inside each of the four conical engine fairings. At separation of the S-IC from the flight vehicle, the eight retrorockets fired, blowing off removable sections of the fairings forward of the fins, and backing the S-IC away from the flight vehicle as the engines on the S-II stage were ignited.

The propellant tanks of the S-IC were manufactured from 2219-series aluminum panels, while the interstage, forward skirt, and thrust structure were built from 7075-series aluminum. The latter three sections also were corrugated with external stringers, providing additional structural support. The propellant tanks did not feature external stringers, as the tank pressurization provided sufficient rigidity.

The S-IC also carried the ODOP transponder to track the flight after takeoff.

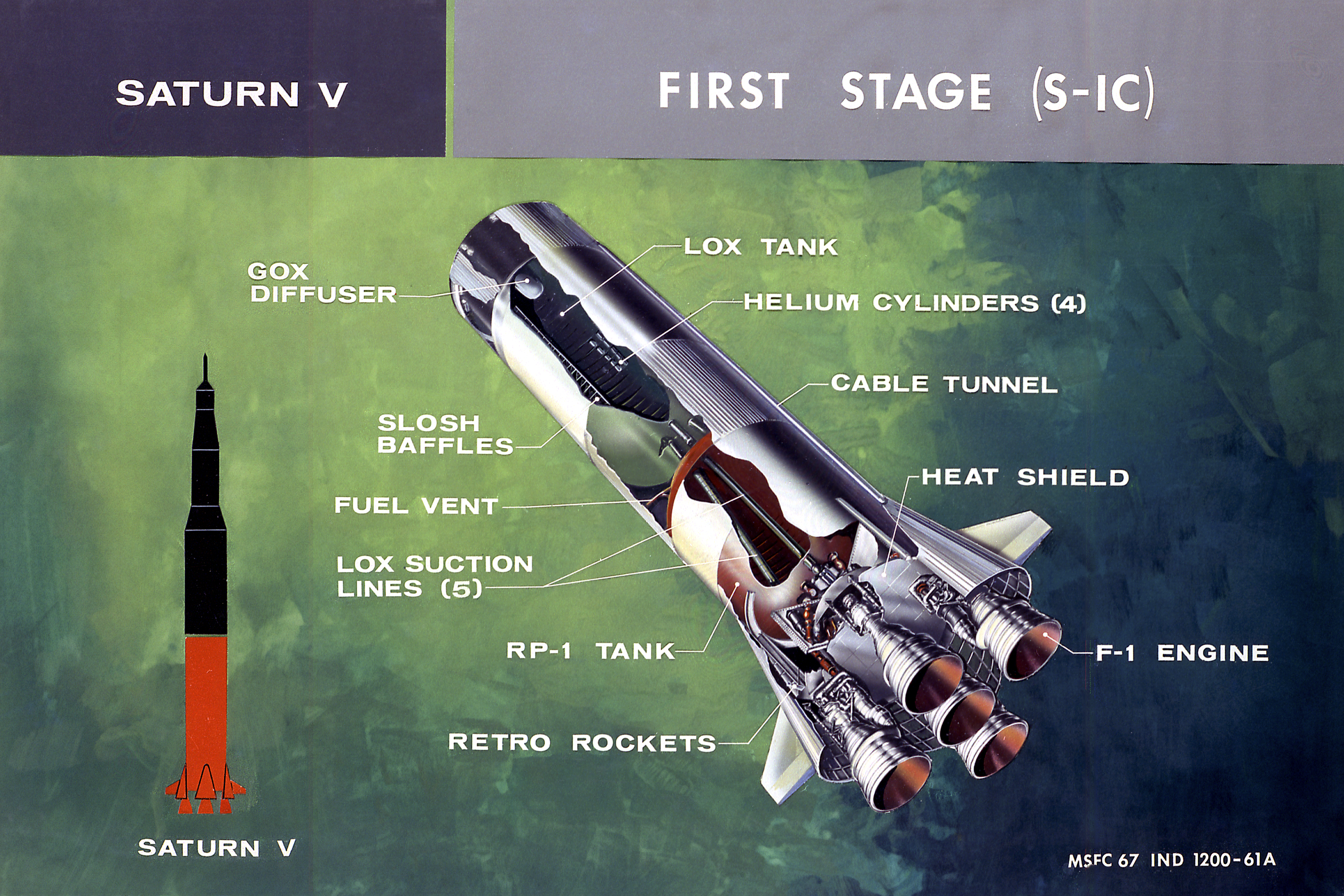
Cutaway diagram of the S-IC.

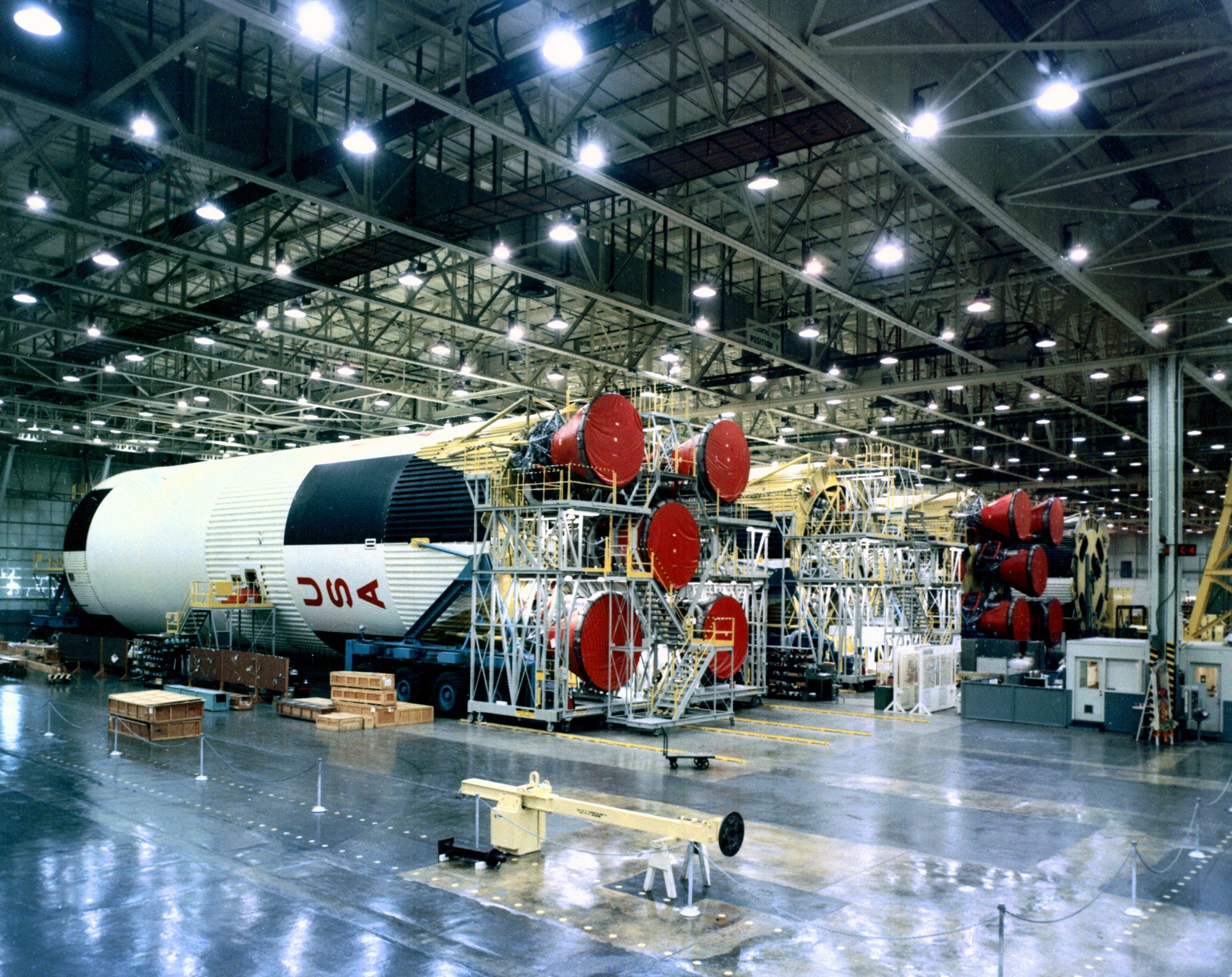
Saturn V first stages S-1C-10, S-1C-11, and S-1C-9 at Michoud Assembly Facility.

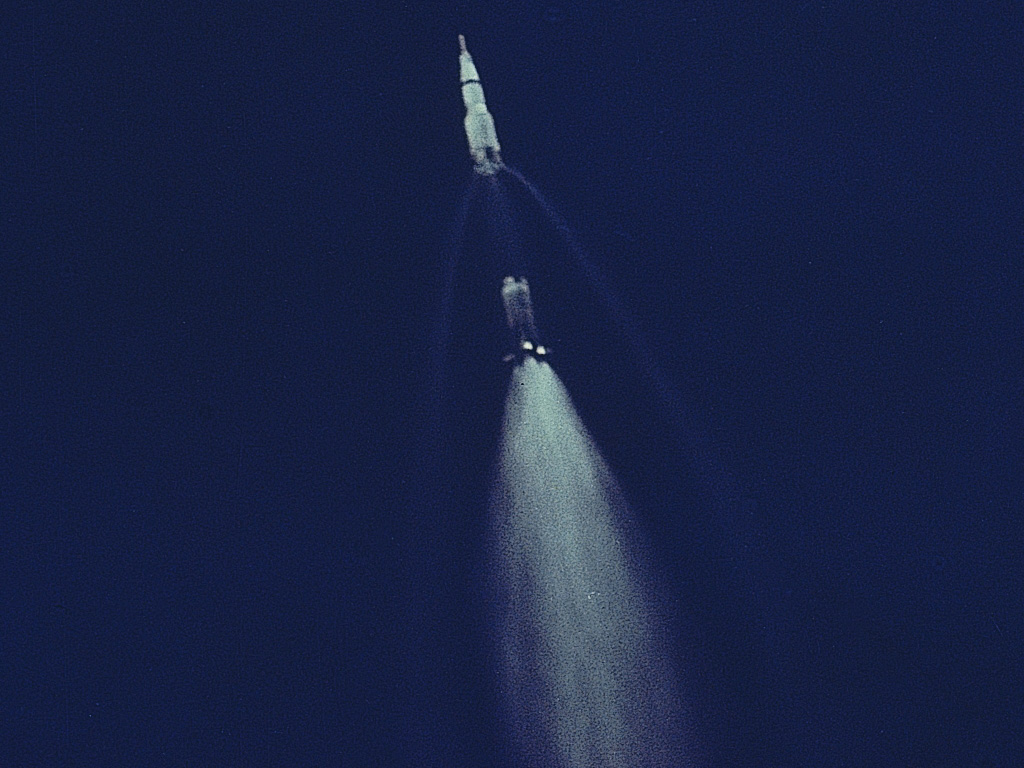
Apollo 11 S-IC separation.

== Stages built ==
Serial number	Use	Launch date	Current location	Notes
S-IC-T	Static test firing		Part of Saturn V display at Kennedy Space Center.	First all-up S-IC stage built, nicknamed "T-Bird." Assembled between 1963-1965. Completed at least 22 test firings between 1965 and 1967 in support of S-IC development and test stand activation.
S-IC-S	Structural load testing (had no engines).		Scrapped after completing testing at MSFC.	
S-IC-F	Facilities testing for checking out launch complex assembly buildings and launch equipment.		Returned to MSFC for storage after testing, later scrapped.	Conducted propellant tank loading tests at LC-39A using Mobile Launcher 1.
S-IC-D	Ground test dynamics model		U.S. Space & Rocket Center, Huntsville, Alabama; 34°42′38.7″N 86°39′24.2″W	
S-IC-1	Apollo 4	November 9, 1967		Manufactured by MSFC.
S-IC-2	Apollo 6	April 4, 1968		Manufactured by MSFC; carried TV and cameras on boattail and forward skirt.
S-IC-3	Apollo 8	December 21, 1968	30°12′N 74°7′W	Manufactured by Boeing (as with all subsequent stages); weighed less than previously manufactured units allowing 36 kg more payload.
S-IC-4	Apollo 9	March 3, 1969	30°11′N 74°14′W	
S-IC-5	Apollo 10	May 18, 1969	30°11′N 74°12′W	Last flight for S-IC R&D Instrumentation.
S-IC-6	Apollo 11	July 16, 1969	30°13′N 74°2′W	One or more engines recovered by a team financed by Jeff Bezos.
S-IC-7	Apollo 12	November 14, 1969	30°16′N 74°54′W	
S-IC-8	Apollo 13	April 11, 1970	30°11′N 74°4′W	
S-IC-9	Apollo 14	January 31, 1971	29°50′N 74°3′W	
S-IC-10	Apollo 15	July 26, 1971	29°42′N 73°39′W	Only carried four retrorockets in two diagonally opposite compartments. Later missions returned to having eight retrorockets.
S-IC-11	Apollo 16	April 16, 1972	30°12′N 74°9′W	
S-IC-12	Apollo 17	December 7, 1972	28°13′N 73°53′W	
S-IC-13	Skylab 1	May 14, 1973		Engine shutoff changed to 1-2-2 from 1–4 to lessen loads on Apollo Telescope Mount.
S-IC-14	Unused		Saturn V display at Johnson Space Center.	Scheduled to fly Apollo 18 in 1974, never flew.
S-IC-15	Unused		On display at Michoud Assembly Facility until June 2016 then preserved at INFINITY Space Center in Mississippi.	Originally intended to fly Apollo 19 in 1974. Designated but never used as a backup Skylab launch vehicle.
S-IC-16	Never completed			Assembly canceled during long-lead item procurement.
S-IC-17	Never completed			Assembly canceled during long-lead item procurement.

== Proposed variants ==
Besides the version flown as the Saturn S-IC stage, other versions were proposed for several vehicle concepts:

=== Saturn S-IC-8 ===
A 1960 study with eight F-1 engines, intended for the Saturn C-8.

=== Saturn IC C-3B ===
A 1961 study with five F-1 engines, intended for the Saturn C-3B and Saturn C-3BN.

=== Saturn IC C-4B ===
A 1961 study with five F-1 engines, intended for the Saturn C-4B.

=== Saturn IC C-5A ===
A 1961 study with five F-1 engines, intended for the Saturn C-5 and Saturn C-5N.

=== Saturn IC-Flat Bulkhead ===
A 1965 study, featuring reduced length and structural weight.

=== Saturn S-IC-TLB stage ===
A 1967 study with two F-1 engines for a reusable booster, intended for the Saturn S-IC-TLB.

=== Saturn S-ID Sustainer-1 ===
A 1967 study with a single F-1 engine for a "stage and a half" booster/sustainer stage configuration.

=== Saturn S-ID Booster ===
A 1968 study with a four F-1 engine for a "stage and a half" recoverable booster, intended for the Saturn V-B, Saturn V-C, and Saturn V-D.

=== Saturn S-ID Sustainer ===
A 1968 study with a single F-1 engine for a "stage and a half" booster/sustainer stage configuration, intended for the Saturn V-B, Saturn V-C, and Saturn V-D.

== See also ==
- S-II
- S-IVB
- Apollo (spacecraft)
- MS-IC
