= Saturn V-C =

The Saturn V-C, was just like the Saturn V-B, studied in the same year as the V-C, except it would use a S-IVB second stage to get a payload into a higher orbit. A Centaur third stage was optional for deep space missions.
