= Saturn INT-20 =

Proposed heavy-lift rocket

- Function: Manned LEO launch vehicle
- Manufacturer: Boeing (S-IC); Douglas (S-IVB)
- Country of origin: United States

Size
- Height: 85 m (279 ft)
- Diameter: 10 m (33 ft)
- Mass: 2,304,000 kg (5,079,000 lb)
- Stages: 2

Capacity

Payload to LEO
- Mass: 60,500 kg (133,400 lb)

Launch history
- Status: Proposal
- Launch sites: LC-39, Kennedy Space Center

First stage - S-IC
- Engines: 3-5 Rocketdyne F-1
- Thrust: 34.02 MN (7,650,000 lb_{f})
- Burn time: 212 seconds
- Propellant: RP-1 / LOX

Second stage S-IVB
- Engines: 1 Rocketdyne J-2
- Thrust: 1 MN (220,000 lb_{f})
- Burn time: ~475 seconds
- Propellant: LH_{2} / LOX

The Saturn INT-20 was a proposed intermediate-payload follow-on from the Apollo Saturn V launch vehicle. A conical-form interstage would be fitted on top of the S-IC stage to support the S-IVB stage, so it could be considered either a retrofitted Saturn IB with a more powerful first stage, or a stubby, cut-down Saturn V without the S-II second stage.

Three variants were studied, one with three F-1 engines in the first stage, one with four, and one with five.

== Performance ==
Without the S-II stage, which made up a large fraction of the mass of the Saturn V, a version of the INT-20 using an unmodified five-engine version of the S-IC booster would be greatly overpowered and accelerate substantially faster than the Saturn V. This would create excessive aerodynamic stress in the low atmosphere. Several solutions to this problem were considered.

Using the original five-engine S-IC would require three engines to be shut down 88 seconds after launch, with the remainder of the first-stage flight flown on only two engines. This meant that a considerable amount of the firing time would be carrying three engines of "dead weight". As a consequence the extra payload over a four-engine variant would only have been about one thousand pounds, and the extra cost and complexity of the fifth engine was unjustified.

A four-engine variant would launch with four engines firing and shut down two engines 146 seconds after launch. The remaining two engines would burn until first-stage shutdown 212 seconds after launch. This variant could put approximately 132,000 pounds (60,000 kg) into a 100 nautical mile (185 km or 115 statute mile) orbit, versus around 250,000 pounds (110,000 kg) for the three-stage Saturn V.

The three-engine variant would burn all three engines up to first-stage shutdown at 146 seconds after launch. This variant could put approximately 78,000 pounds (35,000 kg) of payload into a 100 nautical mile (185 km) orbit, around 2.5 times the useful payload of the Saturn IB.

Both three- and four-engine variants would therefore have provided useful payload capacities (Saturn C-3) intermediate between the Saturn IB and Saturn V, and re-using Saturn V components would reduce costs and simplify ground operations compared to building an entirely new launcher in that payload range.

== See also ==
- Apollo program
- Saturn I
- Saturn IB
- Saturn V
- Apollo Applications Program
- S-IC
- S-II
