= Saturn II =

Proposed NASA heavy-lift launch vehicle

- Saturn II proposals: INT-17, INT-18, INT-19.
- Function: Orbital launch vehicle
- Manufacturer: North American (S-II); Douglas (S-IVB)
- Country of origin: United States

Size
- Height: 167 feet (51 m)
- Diameter: 33 feet (10 m)
- Mass: 1,112,000 to 4,178,200 pounds (504,400 to 1,895,200 kg)
- Stages: 2

Capacity

Payload to LEO (100 nmi (185 km), 28° inclination)
- Mass: 47,000 to 146,400 pounds (21,300 to 66,400 kg)

Associated rockets
- Family: Saturn
- Derivative work: INT-17; INT-18; INT-19

Launch history
- Status: Study 1966
- Launch sites: Kennedy Space Center Launch Complex 39,
- Total launches: 0

Boosters (INT-18) – UA1207
- No. boosters: 2 or 4
- Powered by: 1
- Maximum thrust: 1,600,000 lbf (7,100 kN) SL
- Total thrust: 3,200,000 lbf (14,000 kN) or 6,400,000 lbf (28,000 kN) SL
- Specific impulse: 272 seconds SL
- Burn time: 120 seconds
- Propellant: APCP

First stage (INT-17) – S-II–INT-17
- Height: 81.49 feet (24.84 m)
- Diameter: 33.0 feet (10.1 m)
- Empty mass: 105,000 pounds (48,000 kg) (Note: Includes S-II/S-IVB interstage)
- Gross mass: 1,091,000 pounds (495,000 kg)
- Powered by: 7 HG-3-SL
- Maximum thrust: 1,334,000 lbf (5,930 kN) SL
- Specific impulse: 275 seconds (2.70 km/s) SL; 450 seconds (4.4 km/s) vac
- Burn time: 200 seconds
- Propellant: LH_{2} / LOX

First stage (INT-18) – S-II
- Height: 81.49 feet (24.84 m)
- Diameter: 33.0 feet (10.1 m)
- Empty mass: 86,090 pounds (39,050 kg)
- Gross mass: 1,082,000 pounds (491,000 kg)
- Powered by: 5 Rocketdyne J-2
- Maximum thrust: 551,700 lbf (2,454 kN) SL; 1,161,300 lbf (5,166 kN) vac
- Specific impulse: 200 seconds (2.0 km/s) SL; 421 seconds (4.13 km/s) vac
- Burn time: 390 seconds
- Propellant: LH_{2} / LOX

Second stage – S-IVB-200
- Height: 58.3 feet (17.8 m)
- Diameter: 21.68 feet (6.61 m)
- Empty mass: 28,400 pounds (12,900 kg) (Note: Includes Instrument Unit)
- Gross mass: 261,900 pounds (118,800 kg)
- Powered by: 1 Rocketdyne J-2
- Maximum thrust: 231,900 lbf (1,032 kN) vac
- Specific impulse: 421 seconds (4.13 km/s) vac
- Burn time: 475 seconds
- Propellant: LH_{2} / LOX

The Saturn II was a series of American expendable launch vehicles, studied by North American Aviation under a NASA contract in 1966, derived from the Saturn V rocket used for the Apollo lunar program. The intent of the study was to eliminate production of the Saturn IB, and create a lower-cost heavy launch vehicle based on Saturn V hardware. North American studied three versions with the S-IC first stage removed: the INT-17, a two-stage vehicle with a low Earth orbit payload capability of 47,000 pounds (21,000 kg); the INT-18, which added Titan UA1204 or UA1207 strap-on solid rocket boosters, with payloads ranging from 47,000 pounds (21,000 kg) to 146,400 pounds (66,400 kg); and the INT-19, using solid boosters derived from the Minuteman missile first stage.

For this study, the Boeing company also investigated configurations designated INT-20 and INT-21 which employed its S-IC first stage, and eliminated either North American's S-II second stage, or the Douglas S-IVB third stage. Budget constraints led to cancellation of the study and exclusive use of the Space Shuttle for orbital payloads.

== Concept ==
There was a large payload gap between the Saturn IB's 46,000-pound (21,000 kg) low Earth orbit capacity and the Saturn V's 310,000-pound (140,000 kg) capability. In the mid-1960s NASA's Marshall Space Flight Center (MSFC) initiated several studies to extend the capabilities of the Saturn family. NASA specified a LEO of 100 nautical miles (185 km), 28° inclination for payload calculations, and the studies examined a number of Modified Launch Vehicle (MLV) configurations based on the Saturn IB and Saturn V launch vehicles as well as Intermediate Payload (INT) launch vehicles based on modified Saturn V stages (MS-IC, MS-II, and MS-IVB). Martin Marietta (builder of Atlas and Titan rockets), Boeing (builder of S-IC first stages), and North American Aviation (builder of the S-II second stage) were three of the companies that provided responses.

North American believed the best way to fill the gap was to use the Saturn V's second stage, the S-II, as the first stage of an intermediate launch vehicle. The basic concept of the Saturn II was to save money by ceasing production of the Saturn IB rocket, and replacing it with launch vehicles built entirely with current Saturn V components. This would allow closing down Chrysler Space Division production lines for the S-IB first stage, and would allow for more efficient integration of rocket systems.

== Design ==
The baseline for the Saturn II was a Saturn V, without the Boeing-built S-IC first stage. The Saturn V's second stage S-II became the first stage, and the non-restartable S-IVB-200 used on the Saturn IB became the second stage. Such a vehicle could not fly without modification, because the S-II was designed to operate in the near-vacuum of high altitude space. Atmospheric thrust suppression reduced the five Rocketdyne J-2 engines' 1,000,000 pounds-force (4,400 kN) of vacuum thrust to 546,500 pounds-force (2,431 kN) at sea level, insufficient to lift the 1,364,900-pound (619,100 kg) weight of the two stages off of the ground, even without a payload. This required that the S-II be either refit with higher thrust engines, augmented with solid rocket boosters, or both. Another design variable was the amount of the full 1,005,500 pounds (456,100 kg) propellant load carried in the S-II, and 241,300 pounds (109,500 kg) in the S-IVB stage.

Before any version could be put into production, work on all Saturn variants was stopped in favor of launching all future payloads from the Space Shuttle.

== Saturn INT-17 ==
The Saturn INT-17 was the first version of the Saturn II to be considered. It replaced the first stage's five J-2 engines with seven higher thrust HG-3-SL engines, giving 1,334,000 pounds-force (5,930 kN) of sea level thrust. It would burn a reduced S-II propellant load of 986,000 pounds (447,000 kg) in 200 seconds. The vehicle had a LEO payload capability of 92,000 pounds (42,000 kg) with a gross weight of 1,112,000 pounds (504,000 kg). The reduced payload permitted a savings of 660 pounds (300 kg) in structural weight, and omitting the S-IVB restart capability saved 1,500 pounds (700 kg).

This configuration was dropped when it was determined that the HG-3-SL could not compete with the J-2 in terms of overall performance, reliability, and cost-effectiveness. This required the addition of booster stages in order to provide more takeoff thrust.

== Saturn INT-18 ==
The Saturn INT-18 would have used the standard S-II with J-2 engines, augmented by two or four Titan SRBs. The UA1204 and UA1207 boosters were considered, with the highest total impulse configuration using four UA1207 boosters, capable of placing 146,000 pounds (66,000 kg) of payload into low Earth orbit. Designers considered changing the amount of fuel loaded into the rocket, and whether to ignite the S-II stage on the ground, or whether to launch using the solids, and start the main stage in flight. Two versions omitted the S-IVB stage.

The following configurations were studied:

Liftoff Mass	Boosters	S-II propellant	S-IVB propellant	Payload
2,496,000 lb (1,132,000 kg)	4 UA1204	474,900 lb (215,400 kg)	177,000 lb (80,300 kg)	47,000 lb (21,300 kg)
2,496,000 lb (1,132,000 kg)	4 UA1204	474,900 lb (215,400 kg)	173,100 lb (78,500 kg)	50,900 lb (23,100 kg)
2,271,600 lb (1,030,400 kg)	2 UA1207	560,000 lb (254,000 kg)	177,900 lb (80,700 kg)	60,400 lb (27,400 kg)
2,496,500 lb (1,132,400 kg)	2 UA1207	769,900 lb (349,200 kg)	175,900 lb (79,800 kg)	78,000 lb (35,400 kg)
2,388,000 lb (1,083,000 kg)	2 UA1205	951,500 lb (431,600 kg)	170,600 lb (77,400 kg)	89,300 lb (40,500 kg)
3,462,400 lb (1,570,500 kg)	4 UA1205	970,900 lb (440,400 kg)	170,600 lb (77,400 kg)	114,000 lb (51,700 kg)
4,178,200 lb (1,895,200 kg)	4 UA1207	984,800 lb (446,700 kg)	166,900 lb (75,700 kg)	146,400 lb (66,400 kg)
3,254,500 lb (1,476,200 kg)	4 UA1205	984,800 lb (446,700 kg)	No S-IVB	86,000 lb (39,000 kg)
3,923,300 lb (1,779,600 kg)	4 UA1207	984,800 lb (446,700 kg)	No S-IVB	97,000 lb (44,000 kg)

== Saturn INT-19 ==
The Saturn INT-19 would have used smaller solid boosters, derived from the first stage of the Minuteman missile, to supplement the thrust of the S-II. Eleven configurations were studied, using between four and twelve solids, with some being started at lift-off, and some being started in flight, and varying propellant loads in the Saturn stages. The S-II stage would have been modified by refitting the J-2–SL engines with reduced expansion ratio nozzles, to increase sea level thrust to 174,400 pounds-force (776 kN) per engine. The highest total impulse configuration would have used twelve boosters, with eight started at launch and four started after the first group had been jettisoned. It would have been capable of lofting a payload of 75,400 pounds (34,200 kg).

The following configurations were studied:

Liftoff mass	Boosters, liftoff	Boosters, round 1	Boosters, round 2	S-II propellant	S-IVB propellant	Payload
723,800 pounds (328,300 kg)	0	0	0	414,900 pounds (188,200 kg)	170,000 pounds (77,100 kg)	12,100 pounds (5,500 kg)
1,021,800 pounds (463,500 kg)	2	2	0	479,900 pounds (217,700 kg)	177,000 pounds (80,300 kg)	29,100 pounds (13,200 kg)
1,277,800 pounds (579,600 kg)	4	2	0	612,000 pounds (277,600 kg)	168,900 pounds (76,600 kg)	44,300 pounds (20,100 kg)
1,277,800 pounds (579,600 kg)	4	4	0	521,800 pounds (236,700 kg)	161,000 pounds (73,000 kg)	39,900 pounds (18,100 kg)
1,593,700 pounds (722,900 kg)	6	2	0	810,900 pounds (367,800 kg)	168,900 pounds (76,600 kg)	60,000 pounds (27,200 kg)
1,593,700 pounds (722,900 kg)	6	4	0	702,000 pounds (318,400 kg)	172,000 pounds (78,000 kg)	59,100 pounds (26,800 kg)
1,618,600 pounds (734,200 kg)	6	4	2	649,900 pounds (294,800 kg)	179,000 pounds (81,200 kg)	50,900 pounds (23,100 kg)
1,593,700 pounds (722,900 kg)	6	6	0	603,800 pounds (273,900 kg)	173,900 pounds (78,900 kg)	56,000 pounds (25,400 kg)
1,910,700 pounds (866,700 kg)	8	4	0	905,900 pounds (410,900 kg)	177,900 pounds (80,700 kg)	63,500 pounds (28,800 kg)
1,910,700 pounds (866,700 kg)	8	4	0	905,900 pounds (410,900 kg)	166,900 pounds (75,700 kg)	74,300 pounds (33,700 kg)
1,910,700 pounds (866,700 kg)	8	4	0	905,900 pounds (410,900 kg)	165,800 pounds (75,200 kg)	75,400 pounds (34,200 kg)

== See also ==
- Apollo Applications Program
- Saturn INT-20
- Saturn INT-21
