= Saturn V-3 =

Proposed launch vehicle

Saturn MLV 5-3
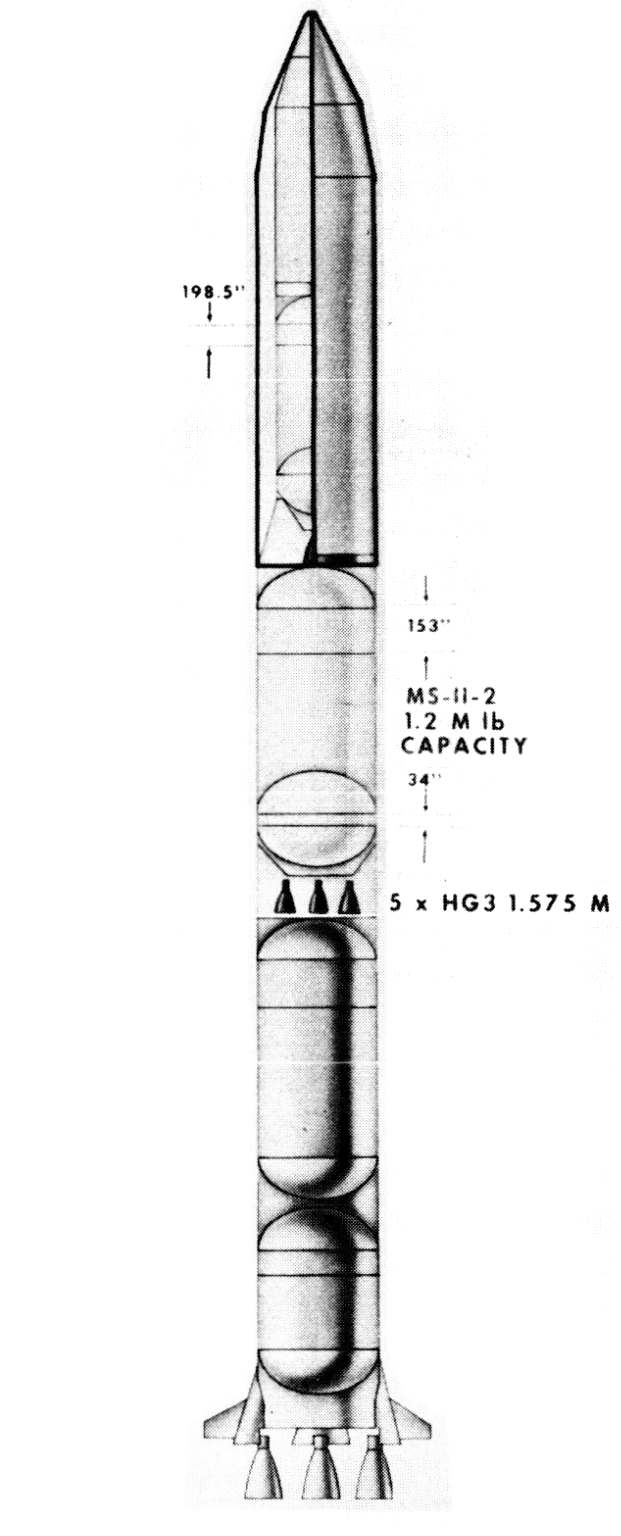
- Function: orbital launch vehicle
- Country of origin: United States

Size
- Height: 121 m (397 ft)
- Diameter: 10 m (33 ft)
- Mass: 3,664,570 kg (8,078,990 lb)
- Stages: 3

Capacity

Payload to LEO
- Mass: 160,400 kg (353,600 lb)

Launch history
- Status: Proposal

First stage – MS-IC-1
- Powered by: 5 F-1A
- Maximum thrust: 45.95 MN (10,330,000 lb_{f})
- Burn time: 158 seconds
- Propellant: RP-1 / LOX

Second stage – MS-II-2
- Powered by: 5 HG-3
- Maximum thrust: 7 MN (1,600,000 lb_{f})
- Burn time: 324 seconds
- Propellant: LH_{2} / LOX

Third stage – MS-IVB-2
- Powered by: 1 HG-3
- Maximum thrust: 1.4 MN (310,000 lb_{f})
- Burn time: 489 seconds
- Propellant: LH_{2} / LOX

The Saturn V-3, also known as the Saturn MLV 5-3, was a conceptual heavy-lift launch vehicle that would have utilized new engines and new stages that were never used on the original Saturn V. The Saturn V-3 was studied by the NASA Marshall Space Flight Center in 1965.

The first stage, called MS-IC-1, was to have used new F-1 engines designated F-1A which utilized a pump-fed design, an anticipated 20% additional thrust, and a six-second improvement in specific impulse on an F-1, with the first stage stretched 20 feet.

The second and third stages, MS-II-2 and MS-IVB-2, were proposed to use new HG-3 engines in place of the J-2 engines, but were never used, although the HG-3 led to the development of the Space Shuttle Main Engine.

The V-3 booster was one of six Saturn MLV designs that never flew, but if these vehicles had been manufactured, they could possibly have been used for the Apollo Applications Program, Manned Orbiting Research Laboratory, Mars fly-by and Mars landing missions in the 1970s and 1980s.
