= Saturn V ELV =

Proposed American rocket

Saturn V-ELV
- Function: orbital launch vehicle
- Country of origin: United States

Size
- Height: 124 m (407 ft)
- Diameter: 10 m (33 ft)
- Mass: 5,172,820 kg (11,404,120 lb)
- Stages: 3

Capacity

Payload to LEO
- Mass: 200,000 kg (440,000 lb)

Launch history
- Status: Proposal

Boosters - SRBs
- Engines: 4 UA1207
- Thrust: 7.12 MN (1,600,000 lb_{f})
- Burn time: 120 seconds
- Propellant: solid

First stage - MS-IC-4(S)B
- Engines: 5 Rocketdyne F-1
- Thrust: 38.72 MN (8,700,000 lb_{f})
- Burn time: 206 seconds
- Propellant: RP-1 / LOX

Second stage MS-II-1A
- Engines: 7 Rocketdyne J-2
- Thrust: 63.81 MN (14,350,000 lb_{f})
- Burn time: 625 seconds
- Propellant: LH_{2} / LOX

Third stage - MS-IVB-1A
- Engines: 1 Rocketdyne J-2
- Thrust: 1.03 MN (230,000 lb_{f})
- Burn time: 625 seconds
- Propellant: LH_{2} / LOX

The Saturn V-ELV (Earth Launch Vehicle) was to be an enlarged Saturn V with the addition of four UA1207 solid rocket boosters derived from the Titan IV launch vehicle and liquid propellant stages derived from the conceptual Saturn MLV-V-4(S)-A* and MLV-V-1A. Had it been built it would have been able to put a 200,000 kg payload into low Earth orbit or a 67,000 kg payload into a translunar trajectory. The ELV was intended to serve as part of a crewed NASA mission to Mars, though that idea eventually fell out of favor largely due to political and financial concerns. A Mars mission would have used a total of 10 ELV's - 6 for the space vehicle and 4 for the logistics vehicles. In addition to Mars, the ELV was intended to serve as a platform for unmanned exploratory missions to Venus.

At the time, it appears ELV was also a generic catch-all term for any large crewed rocket. There are references to both the Saturn I and Saturn V as an ELV.

== Plans for ELV Usage ==
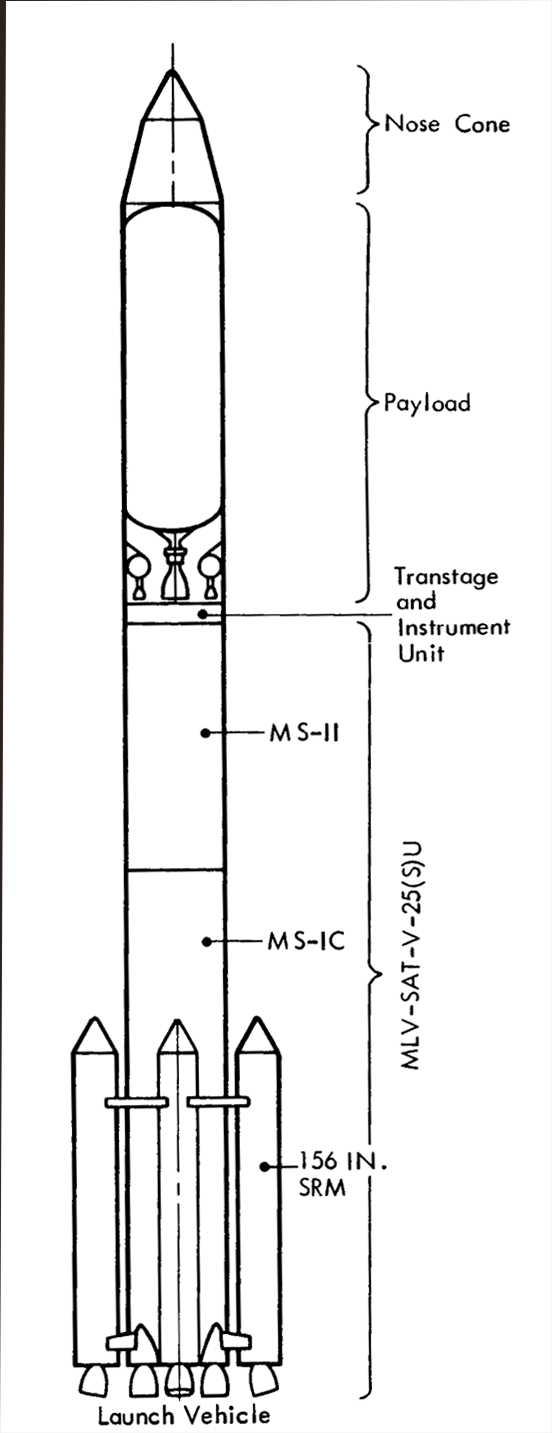
A 1968 proposal for a Saturn V ELV (MLV-SAT-V-25(S)U)

According to the 1968 NASA document "Integrated Manned Interplanetary Spacecraft Concept Definition", there was a planned schedule for exploration under the ELV program. After the first crewed Apollo lunar landing, NASA was hoping to progress through the following list:

1. First uncrewed hyperbolic reentry at 65k feet per second.
2. First nuclear engine ground firing.
3. First nuclear engine and nuclear stage space firing.
4. First launch of an uprated Saturn V-ELV.
5. First crewed hyperbolic reentry at 65k feet per second.
6. First long-time space soak and firing of a nuclear propulsion module. (Note: In this context, "space soak" means “to leave in space for an extended period of time”)
7. First long-time simulated crewed planetary mission operation.
8. First full planetary simulated mission in Earth orbit.
9. First crewed planet reentry simulation.
10. First crewed planetary capture mission.
11. First crewed planetary landing mission.

== Vehicle Layout ==
Zero Stage	1st Stage	2nd Stage	3rd Stage
4x UA1207	MS-IC-4(S)B	MS-II-1A	MS-IVB-1A
