= Saturn INT-21 =

American super-heavy-lift rocket, never built

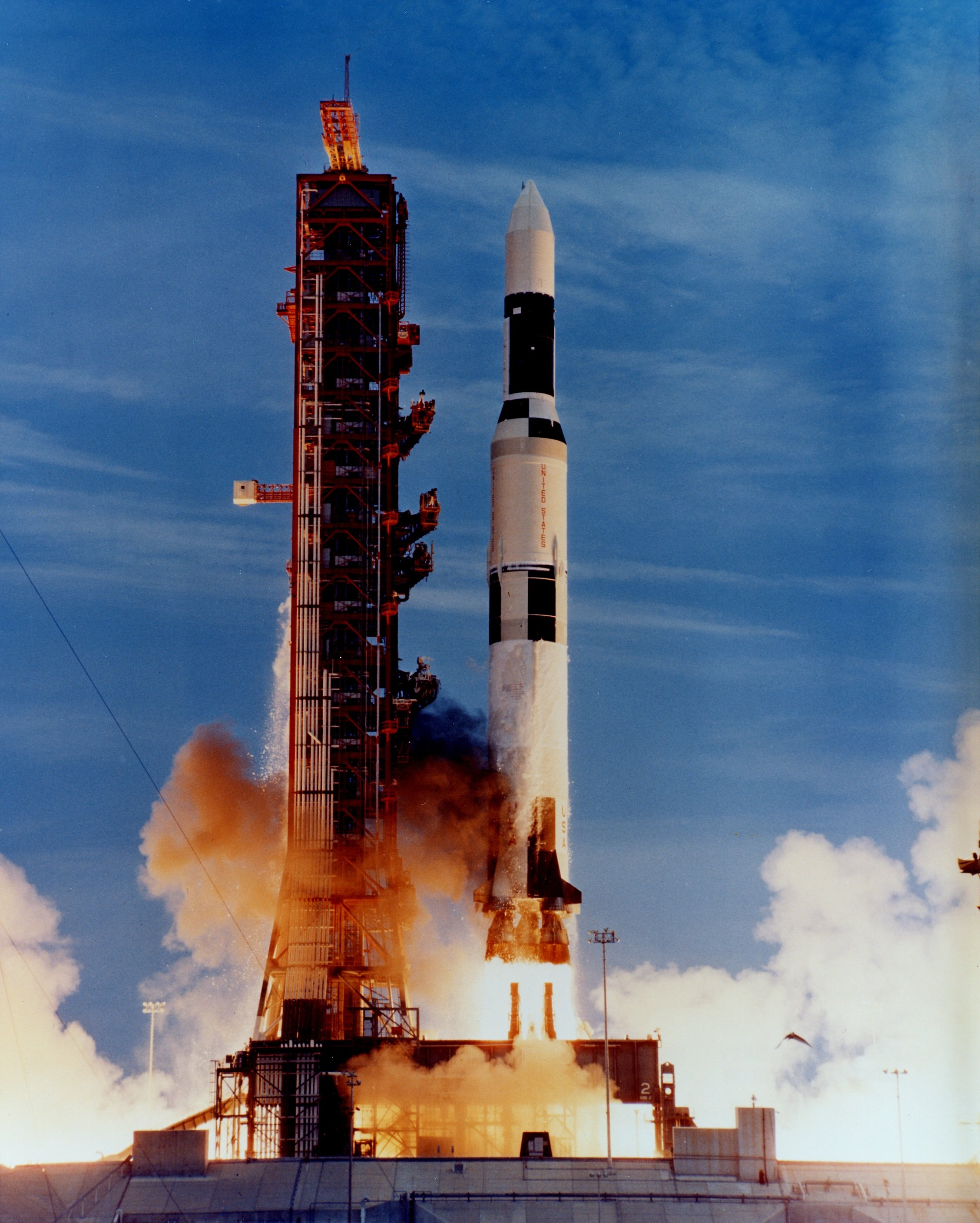
- The Saturn INT-21 would have been similar to the Saturn V which launched the Skylab space station, on May 14, 1973
- Function: Launch vehicle
- Manufacturer: Boeing (S-IC); North American (S-II)
- Country of origin: United States

Size
- Height: 98.5 m (323 ft) (without payload)
- Diameter: 10.06 m (33.0 ft)
- Mass: 2,916,080 kg (6,428,860 lb)
- Stages: 2

Capacity

Payload to LEO
- Mass: 115,900 kg (255,500 lb)

Launch history
- Status: Study
- Launch sites: LC-39A, Kennedy Space Center
- Total launches: 0

First stage - S-IC
- Engines: 5 Rocketdyne F-1
- Thrust: 34.02 MN (7,650,000 lb_{f})
- Burn time: 150 seconds
- Propellant: RP-1 / LOX

Second stage S-II
- Engines: 5 Rocketdyne J-2
- Thrust: 5 MN (1,100,000 lb_{f})
- Burn time: 360 seconds
- Propellant: LH_{2} / LOX

The Saturn INT-21 was a study for an American orbital launch vehicle of the 1970s. It was derived from the Saturn V rocket used for the Apollo program, using its first and second stages and capable of placing 115,900 kg (255,500 lb) to LEO, but lacking the third stage. The guidance unit would be moved from the top of the third stage to the top of the second stage. The INT-21 was never flown.

A related variant was launched once, from the Kennedy Space Center, Florida carrying the Skylab space station into orbit, at 17:30 UTC, on May 14, 1973. As Skylab was built from an S-IVB stage, there was no need to move the guidance unit. This version was intended to be used for other flights in the Apollo Applications Program, and would have also been used to launch other American space stations, including Skylab B.

== See also ==
- Comparison of orbital launch systems
- Saturn I
- Saturn IB
- Saturn I SA-1
