= Saturn IB-B =

Launch vehicle concept

- Manufacturer: Douglas Studies
- Country of origin: United States

Size
- Height: 57m (187 ft)
- Diameter: 10 m (33 ft)
- Mass: 652,440 kg (1,438,380 lb)
- Stages: 2

Capacity
- Payload to LEO: 22,700 kg (50,000 lb)

Associated rockets
- Family: Saturn
- Based on: Saturn IB
- Comparable: Proton-K

Launch history
- Status: Cancelled

The Saturn IB-B was a proposed modification to the Saturn IB rocket, it was to be essentially an uprated version of the Saturn IB using the new MS-IVB-2 upper stage powered by the HG-3 engine developed from the S-IVB and an uprated S-IB-A first stage. It was Proposed by Douglas Studies in 1965 but it never passed the drawing board.
