= Saturn MLV =

Proposed successor to the Saturn V rocket

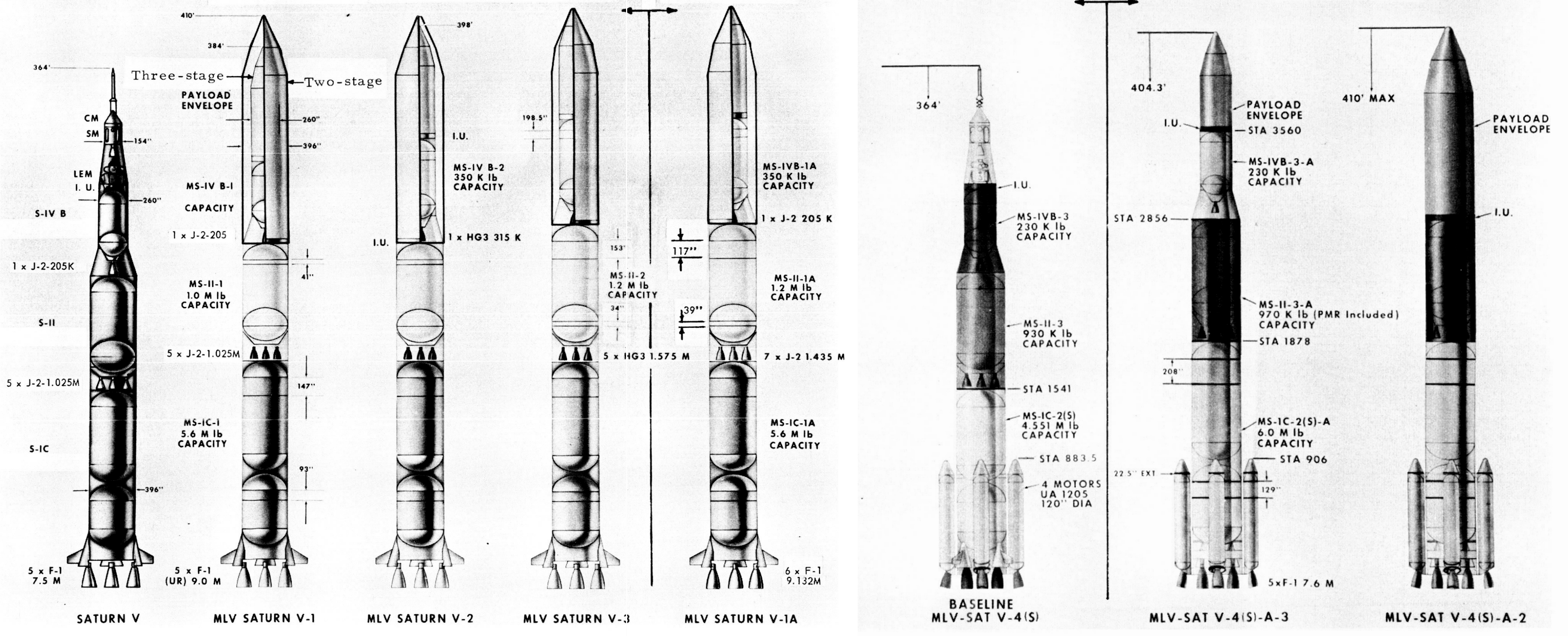
Saturn MLV V-1 to V-4 configurations

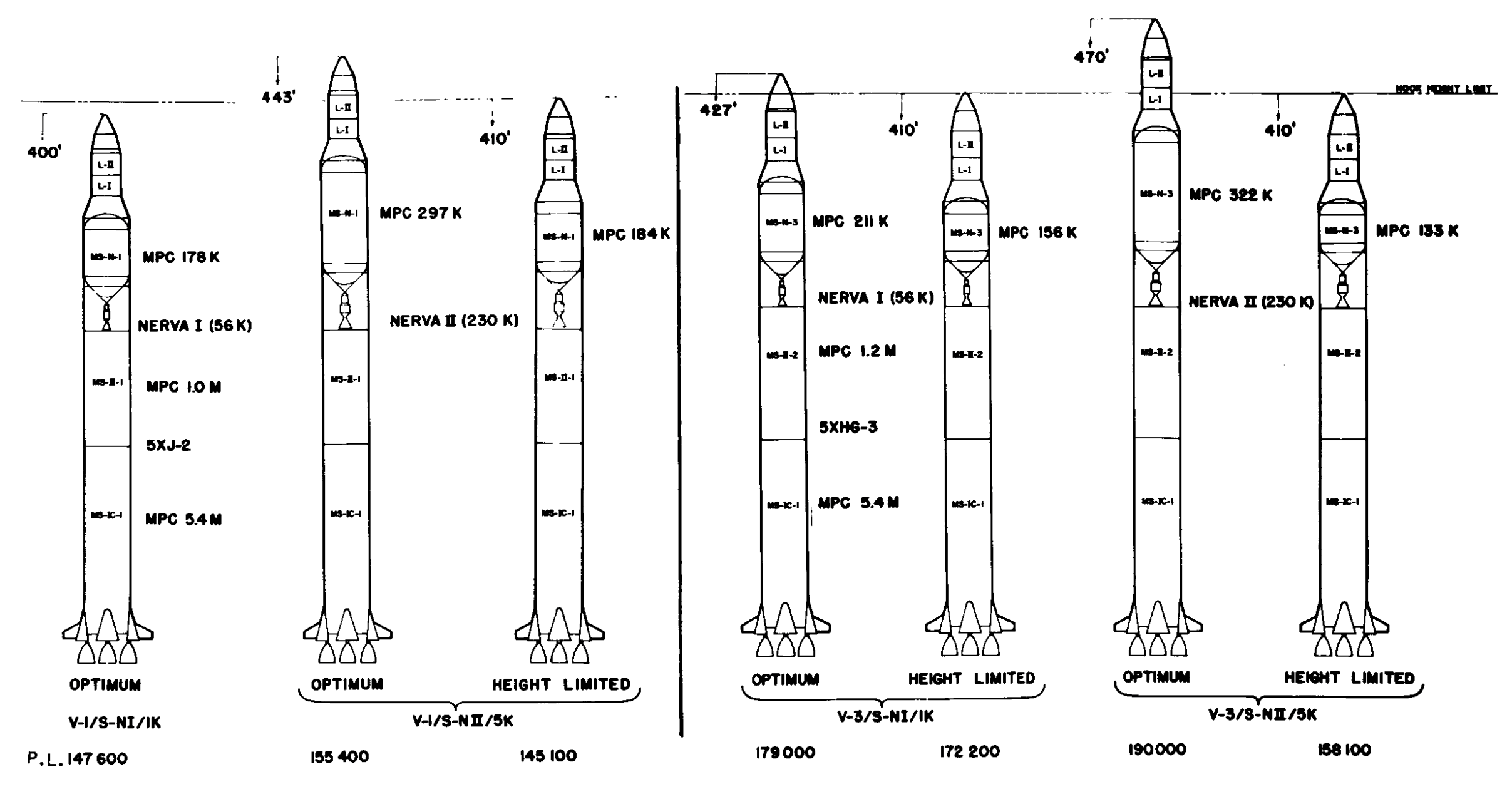
Saturn MLV V-1 and V-3 nuclear configurations

The Saturn MLV was a proposed concept family of rockets, intended as a follow-on to the Saturn V. MLV stands for "Modified Launch Vehicle".

Vehicle configurations representative of several alternative uprating methods were specified by the Marshall Space Flight Center for initial studies.

== Proposed modifications ==
1. Thrust uprating and modifying of the five F-1 rocket engines used in the first S-IC stage, and corresponding increases in propellant tank capacities.
2. Addition of a sixth F-1 engine in the S-IC stage, as an alternative to engine uprating, plus increased propellant capacities.
3. Use of UA1205 solid rocket boosters derived from the Titan IIIC vehicle.
4. Additional J-2 engines in the S-II stage, ~131 s increased upper stage propellant capacities.
5. Improved or advanced upper stage engines, such as the HG-3, plus increased propellant capacities.

The baseline Saturn MLV would incorporate these changes from the Saturn V vehicle. The Saturn IC first stage would have been stretched 240 inches (610 cm) with 2,500,000 kg (5,600,000 lb) of propellant and five new F-1A engines; the S-II second stage would have been stretched 41 inches (100 cm) with 450,000 kg (1,000,000 lb) of propellant and five J-2 engines; the S-IVB third stage would have been strengthened, but with a standard 100,000 kg (230,000 lb) of propellant, and one J-2 engine. Nuclear propulsion in the third stage and toroidal J-2 engines in the second and third stages were also investigated.

MLV variants
	Boosters	1st Stage	2nd Stage	3rd Stage	LEO Payload	TLI Payload
MLV-V-1	-	MS-IC-1	MS-II-1	MS-IVB-1	137,250 kg (302,580 lb)	48,800 kg (107,500 lb)
MLV-V-1/NERVA 1	-	MS-IC-1	MS-II-1	-	-	55,680 kg (122,760 lb)
MLV-V-1/NERVA 2	-	MS-IC-1	MS-II-1	-	-	57,359 kg (126,455 lb)
MLV-V-1A	-	MS-IC-1A	MS-II-1A	MS-IVB-1A	145,000 kg (320,000 lb)	-
MLV-V-1/J-2T/200K	-	MS-IC-1	MS-II-1-J-2T/200K	-	-	-
MLV-V-1/J-2T/250K	-	MS-IC-1	MS-II-1-J-2T/250K	-	-	-
MLV-V-2	-	MS-IC-1	MS-II-1	MS-IVB-2	137,250 kg (302,580 lb)	-
MLV-V-3	-	MS-IC-1	MS-II-2	MS-IVB-2	160,440 kg (353,710 lb)	62,200 kg (137,100 lb)
MLV-V-3/NERVA 1	-	MS-IC-1	MS-II-2	-	-	81,000 kg (179,000 lb)
MLV-V-3/NERVA 2	-	MS-IC-1	MS-II-2	-	-	86,000 kg (190,000 lb)
MLV-V-4(S)	UA1205	S-IC	MS-II-4(S)B	MS-IVB-1	118,000 kg (260,000 lb)	~ 54,000 kg (120,000 lb)
MLV-V-4(S)-A	UA1205	MS-IC-1	MS-II-1	MS-IVB-1	160,880 kg (354,680 lb)	~ 60,000 kg (133,000 lb)
MLV-V-4(S)-B	UA1205	MS-IC-1	MS-II-1-J-2T/250K	-	171,990 kg (379,170 lb)	63,160 kg (139,240 lb)

== MS-IC first stage ==
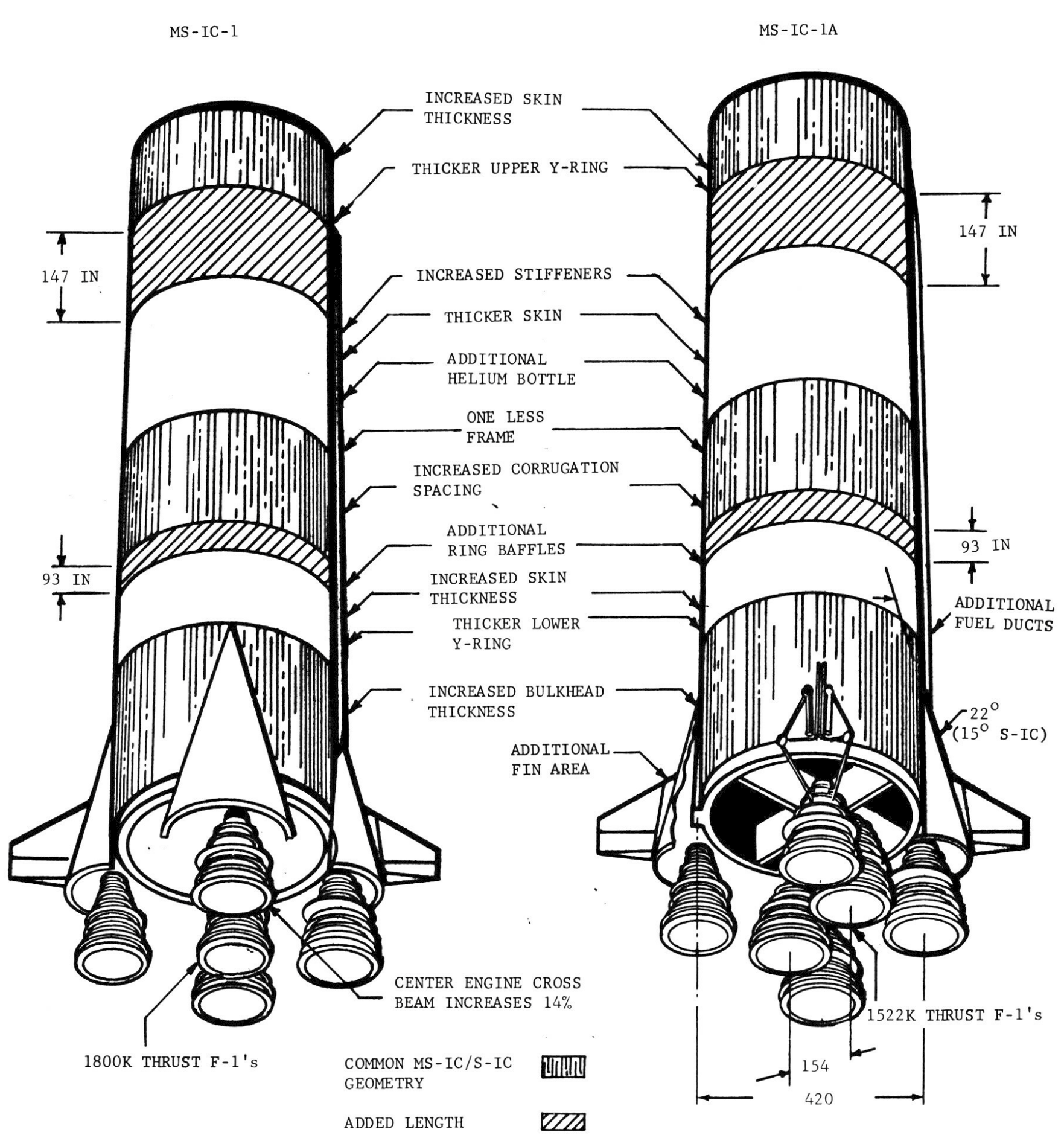
MS-IC-1 and MS-IC-1A stage diagram

S-IC height growth would have been limited to 12 m (40 ft), because of enclosed barge limits. If this was solved, height growth would have been limited to 14 m (46 ft), because of vertical assembly crane limits.

The MS-IC-1 first stage would have been strengthened, because of higher structural loads. It would also have been stretched 6.1 m (20 ft). The propellant pressurization system would have had 15% higher flow rates to account for the differences between the F-1 and F-1A engines. The stage would have weighed 16,000 kg (36,000 lb) more than the S-IC while empty.

The MS-IC-1A would have been a variant of the MS-IC-1 with 6 engines individually weaker than the MS-IC-1's engines. The total amount of thrust would have been about 1.46% higher than the MS-IC-1. Because of the additional engine, inboard gimbal is limited to 2.5°, while outboard is restricted to 7.8°. This would have not posed large control issues. Additional supply lines would have been needed for the MS-IC-1A. The stage would have weighed 8,900 kg (19,600 lb) more than the MS-IC-1 and 25,000 kg (56,000 lb) more than the S-IC, while empty. Manufacturing would remain largely similar, while testing and vehicle assembly equipment would see major changes.

Other variants studied were the MS-IC-4(S)B (336 inch stretch), MS-IC/260 (fuel and propellant tanks housed above strap-on solid rocket motors), MS-IC-23(L) (240 inch stretch) and MS-IC-3B (20 foot stretch with F-1A engines).

== MS-II second stage ==
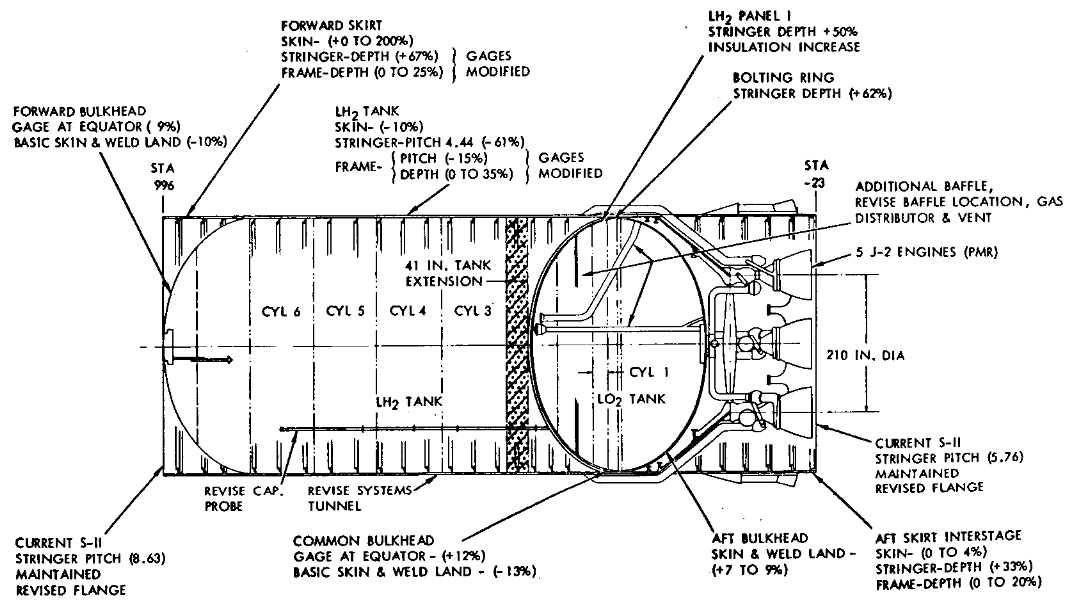
MS-II-1 stage diagram

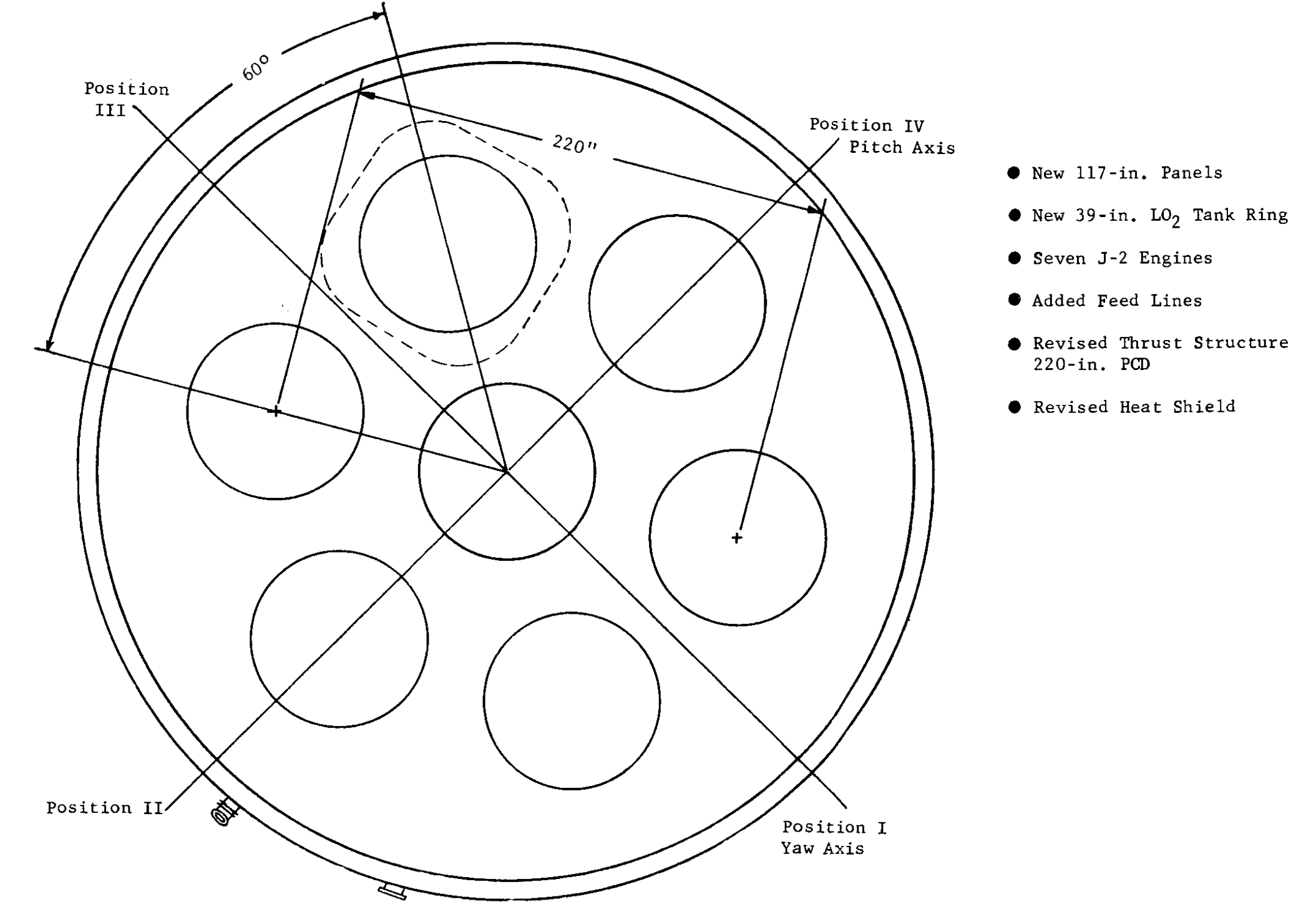
MS-II-1A stage engine placement diagram

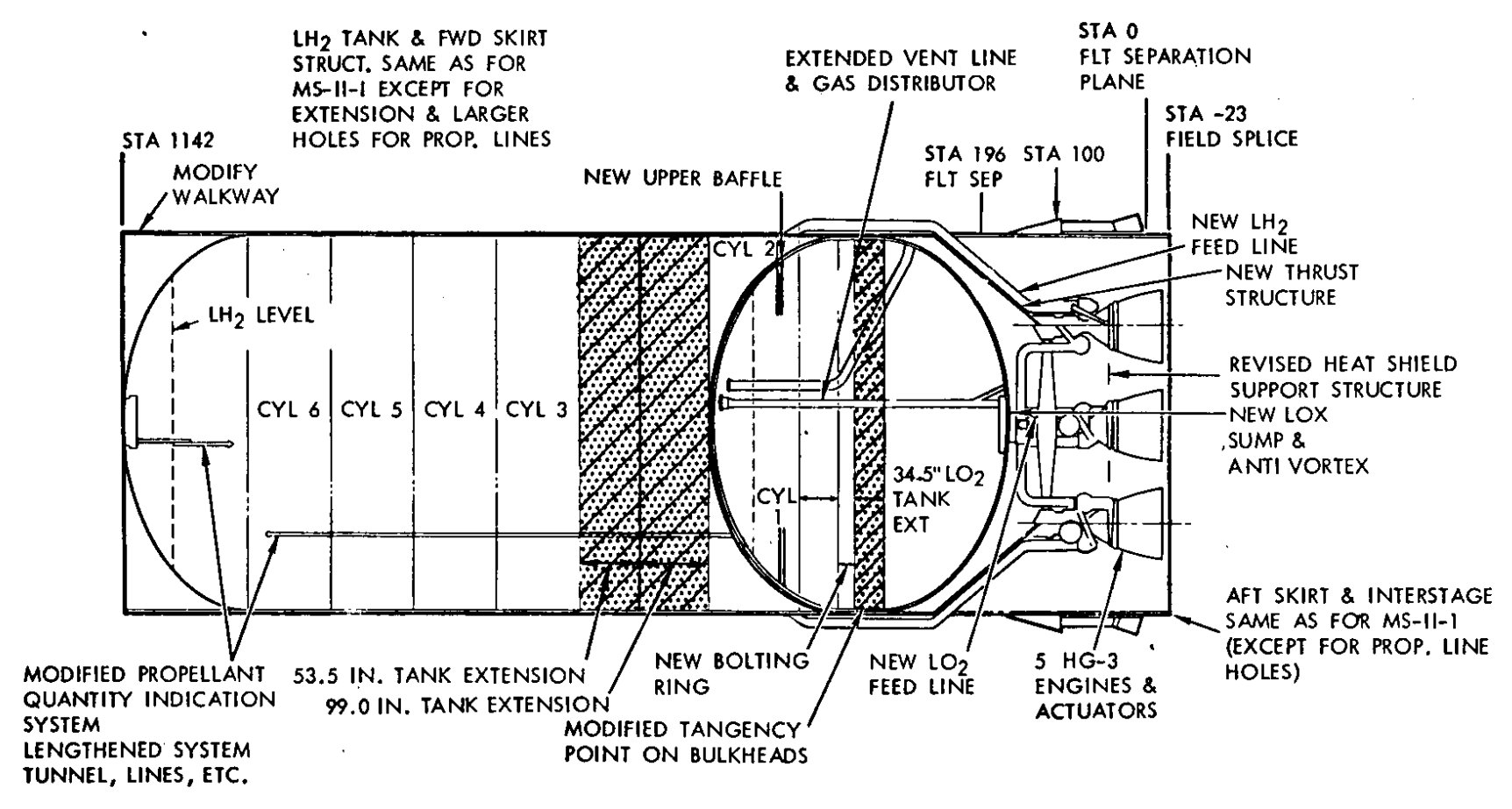
MS-II-2 stage diagram

The MS-II-1 variant would have been almost unchanged from the S-II stage, except for it being strengthened to handle increased flight loads. Manufacturing and GSE would not have had major changes.

The MS-II-1A variant would have had seven J-2 engines. Major changes would have been in the propulsion and thrust structure. The variant would have been extended to account for the 540,000 kg (1,200,000 lb) of propellant.

The MS-II-2 variant would have had to have the thrust structure redesigned, because of the switch to the HG-3 engine. Propellant load would be increased up to a maximum of 540,000 kg (1,200,000 lb) and stage length would have been extended less than or equal to 470 cm (187 in), without major facility changes. Because of the HG-3 engine, the interface between the stage and engines would have needed changes. Electrical, propellant management and propellant dispersion systems would also have required changes.

Manufacturing changes for the MS-II-2 variant from the MS-II-1 variant would have been small, except for the increased diameter of the HG-3 engine's feedlines' increased diameter causing changes to the LH2 tanks feedline fittings. Changes to the LOX tank and thrust structure would also have required changes. GSE changes would also have required changes for handling, transportation. New equipment for propulsion systems would also have been required. Changes would have been required to facilities, in order to have space for duplicate tooling. Testing would only have required minor changes to facilities.

Other variants studied were the MS-II-1-J-2T-200K (41 inch stretch and J-2T-200K engines), MS-II-1-J-2T-250K (41 inch stretch and J-2T-250k engines), MS-II-3B (15.5 foot stretch) and MS-II-4(S)B.

== MS-IVB third stage ==
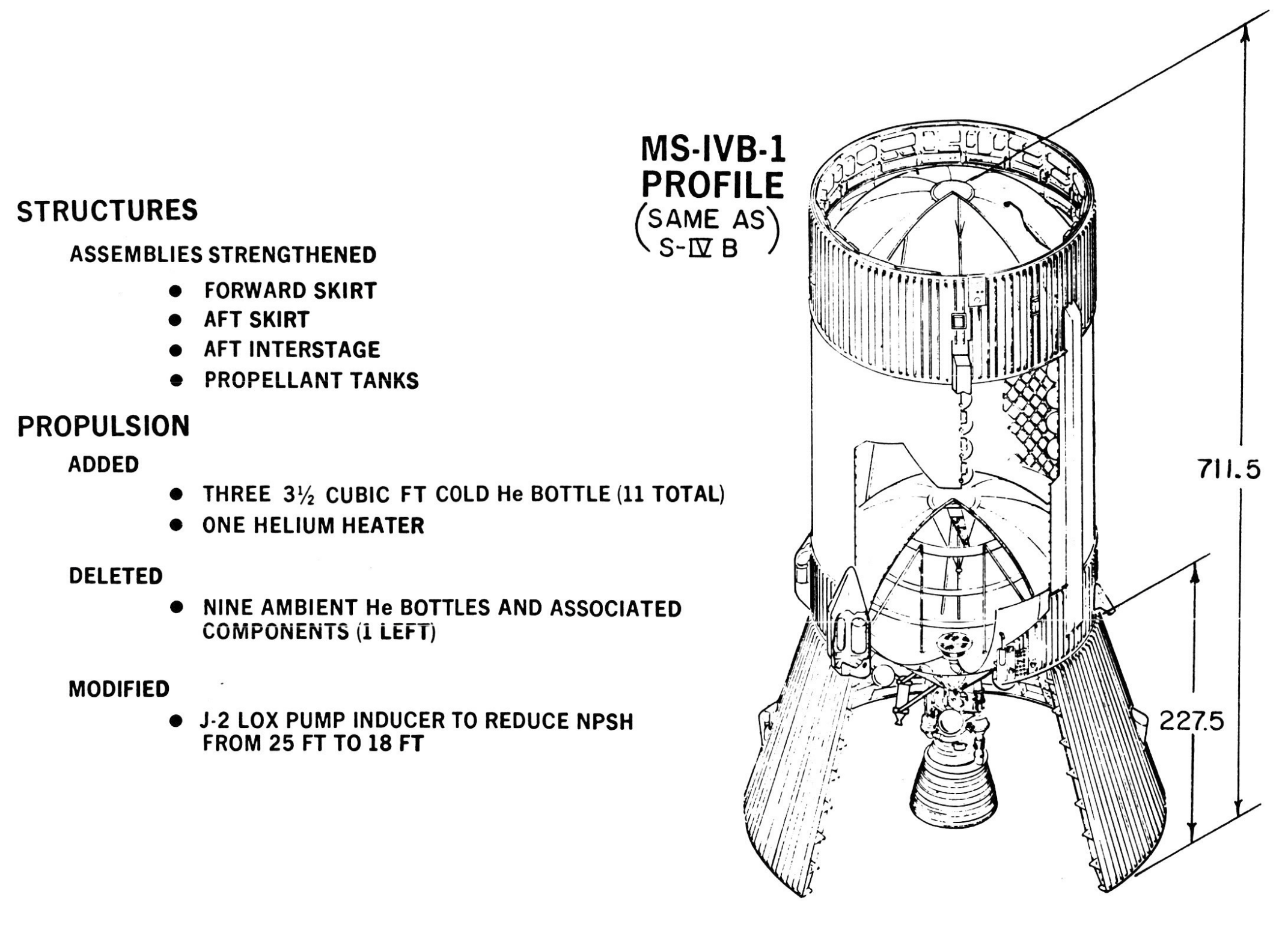
Differences between S-IVB and MS-IVB-1

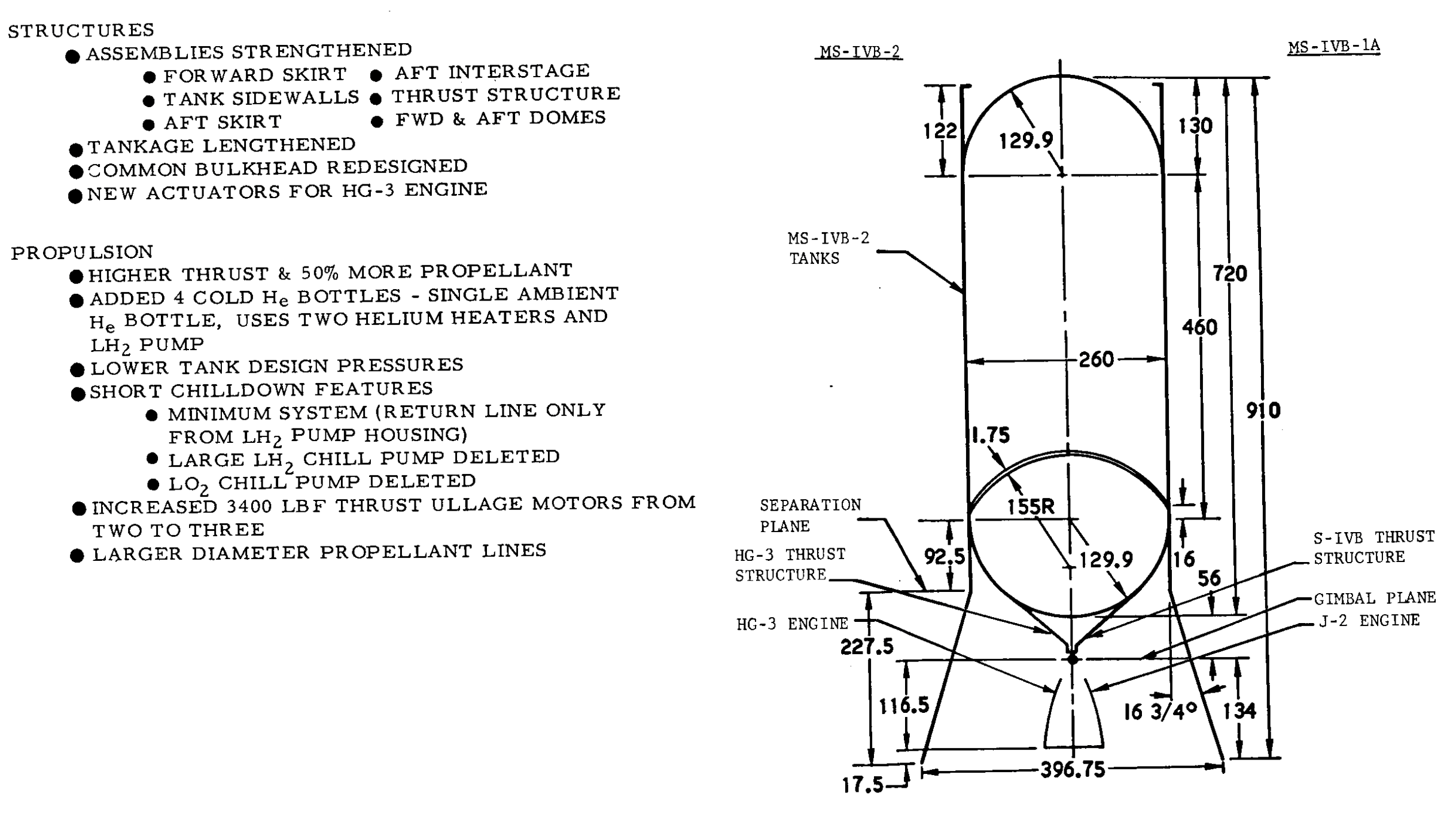
MS-IVB-1A and MS-IVB-2

The MS-IVB-1 third stage would have had the same size and shape as the unmodified S-IVB stage, but it would have been strengthened because of the larger payload capacity and flight stresses. The J-2 LOX pump would have been modified. The MS-IVB-1 would have weighed 598 kg (1,319 lb) more than the S-IVB. Manufacturing for the MS-IVB-1 would only have required minor changes. The helium repressurization system would have replaced ambient helium bottles with cold ones and a heater.

The MS-IVB-2 would have been a stretched version of the S-IVB using the HG-3 engine. The MS-IVB-2 would also have required strengthening. The thrust structure would have been replaced, because of the higher thrust of the HG-3 engine. The LOX tank would have received an additional cylindrical segment. The propulsion system's helium system would have been modified in a similar way as the MS-IVB-1, but with an additional heater. The common bulkhead would have been flatter. Because of the switch to the HG-3 engine, the LOX and LH2 chilldown pumps would have been removed. Manufacturing would have required major changes, with under half of the 52 major tools unchanged. GSE models would also have to be largely modified, with again under half remaining unchanged.

The MS-IVB-1A is similar to the MS-IVB-2, but with a J-2 engine and thrust structure. It also has heavier tank walls and other less notable changes.

Other variants studied were the MS-IVB-3B and the MS-IVB-4(S)B.

== Engine uprating ==
Some MLV configurations would have required that some engines were uprated.

=== F-1 Uprating ===
As an alternative to adding an additional engine, uprating the thrust was investigated. The investigation used the 1522K configuration as the base for uprating. All uprated engines would have had to use a 76 cm (30 in) turbine, because the uprating was limited by the 89 cm (35 in) turbine used on the 1552K configuration.

Besides the 30 inch turbine, the 1650K config would have required improved pump impellers, and a stronger gas generator at a lower mixture ratio. The 1800K configuration would have required an increased pump impeller diameter, increasing gas generator volume to solve temperature control issues, and reducing turbine exhaust back-pressure. Uprating past the 1800K configuration would have been limited by turbopump torque and critical speed.

=== J-2 Uprating ===
1,000,000 N (225,000 lbf) and 1,100,000 N (250,000 lbf) thrust variants were selected for uprating studies, with the base variant being the 890,000 N (200,000 lbf) variant.

Uprating to the 1,000,000 N (225,000 lbf) variant would have required changes to the turbopumps, gas generator control valve, thrust chamber bypass system, and the injector. To uprate to the 1,100,000 N (250,000 lbf) variant from the 1,000,000 N (225,000 lbf) variant would have required changes to the oxidizer turbopump assembly, concentric gas generator control valve, fuel turbopump, and high-pressure ducts added with the uprating.

== Nuclear propulsion ==
In the MS-IVB stages, the use of nuclear propulsion could have been used to achieve higher Trans-lunar injection performance.

Rocket	Trans-lunar injection	Lunar orbit	Lunar surface
Saturn V (for comparison)	42,400 kg (93,500 lb)	30,300 kg (66,800 lb)	12,300 kg (27,100 lb)
Saturn V/NERVA 1 (for comparison)	55,680 kg (122,760 lb)	40,200 kg (88,600 lb)	18,200 kg (40,200 lb)
Saturn V/NERVA 2 (for comparison)	57,359 kg (126,455 lb)	41,400 kg (91,300 lb)	19,000 kg (41,800 lb)
MLV-V-1 (for comparison)	48,800 kg (107,500 lb)	35,000 kg (77,100 lb)	15,000 kg (33,000 lb)
MLV-V-1/NERVA 1	67,000 kg (147,600 lb)	48,600 kg (107,200 lb)	23,000 kg (50,800 lb)
MLV-V-1/NERVA 2	70,500 kg (155,400 lb)	51,300 kg (113,100 lb)	24,500 kg (54,100 lb)
MLV-V-3 (for comparison)	62,200 kg (137,100 lb)	45,000 kg (99,000 lb)	20,800 kg (45,900 lb)
MLV-V-3/NERVA 1	81,200 kg (179,100 lb)	59,300 kg (130,800 lb)	29,100 kg (64,100 lb)
MLV-V-3/NERVA 2	86,000 kg (190,000 lb)	63,100 kg (139,100 lb)	31,200 kg (68,800 lb)

Because of the lower density of LH2, the vehicle would have been taller. This would have caused higher structural loads and sometimes would have exceeded facility height limitations. The higher structural loads are believed to be solvable without major changes. Both V-3 vehicles and the V-1/NERVA would have had exceeded the 120 m (410 ft) height limit by up to 18 m (60 ft). Limiting nuclear engine propellant to reduce the height to 120 m (410 ft) would have caused payload to TLI being reduced by up to approximately 14,000 kg (30,000 lb). This could have been solved by:

1. Using 1,010 cm (396 in) diameter stages.
2. Shortening off-loaded chemical boost stage propellant tanks.
3. Assembling the uppermost stages outside the VAB.
4. Using hammerhead nuclear stages.
5. Increasing the height of one VAB cell's hook height.

Crawler-related changes and issues are road load limits, and location of service arms and checkout equipment.
