= S-II =

Second stage of the Saturn V, built by North American Aviation

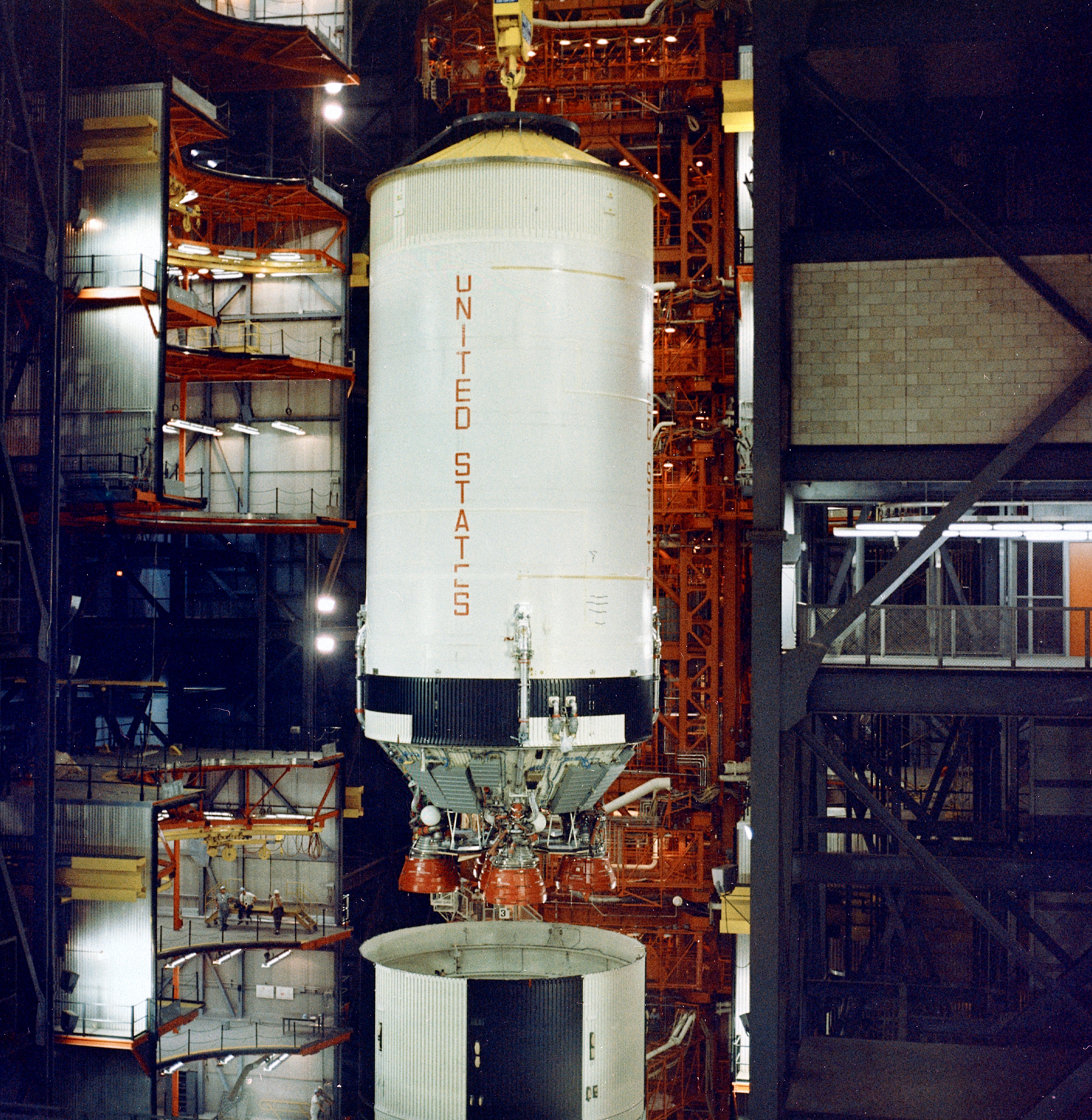
- The Apollo 6 S-II stage during stacking operations in the VAB
- Manufacturer: North American
- Country of origin: United States
- Used on: Saturn V

General characteristics
- Height: 81 ft 8 in (24.9 m)
- Diameter: 32 ft 10 in (10 m)
- Gross mass: 1,058,000 lb (480,000 kg)
- Propellant mass: 977,000 lb (443,000 kg)
- Empty mass: 79,700 lb (36,200 kg)

Launch history
- Status: Retired
- Total launches: 13
- Successes (stage only): 12
- Other: Partial failure (Apollo 6)
- First flight: November 9, 1967 (Apollo 4)
- Last flight: May 14, 1973 (Skylab 1)

Specifications
- Powered by: 5 × J-2
- Maximum thrust: 1,000,000 lbf (4,400 kN)
- Specific impulse: 421 s (4.13 km/s)
- Burn time: 367 seconds
- Propellant: LH_{2} / LOX

The S-II (pronounced "S-two") was the second stage of the Saturn V rocket. It was built by North American Aviation. Using liquid hydrogen (LH_{2}) and liquid oxygen (LOX) it had five J-2 engines in a quincunx pattern. The second stage accelerated the payload through the upper atmosphere with 1,000,000 pounds-force (4.4 MN) of thrust.

== History ==
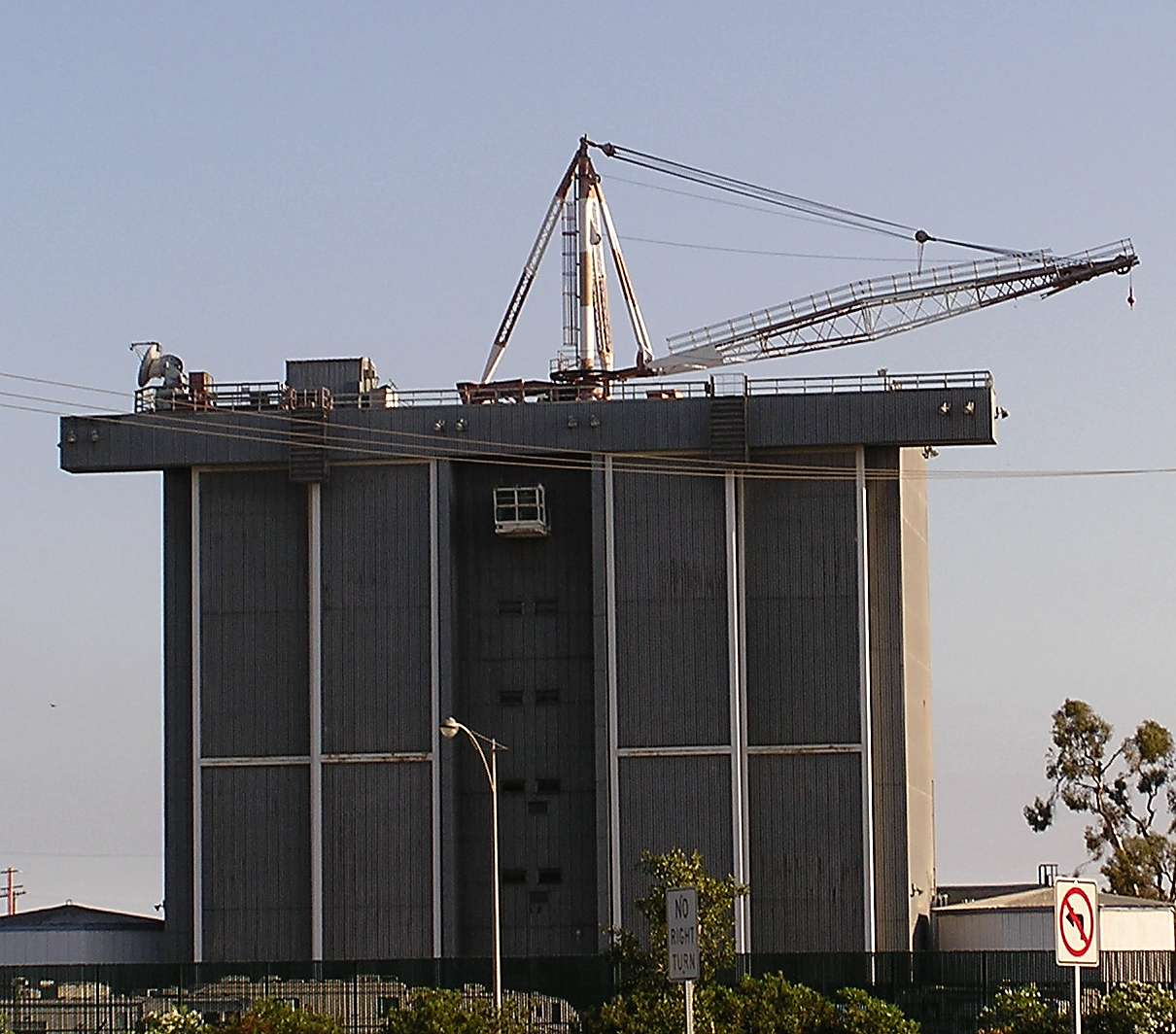
S-II assembly building in Seal Beach, CA

The beginning of the S-II came in December 1959 when a committee recommended the design and construction of a high-thrust, liquid hydrogen fueled engine. The contract for this engine was given to Rocketdyne and it would be later called the J-2. At the same time the S-II stage design began to take shape. Initially it was to have four J-2 engines and be 74 feet (23 m) in length and 260 inches (6.6 m) in diameter.

In 1961 the Marshall Space Flight Center began the process to find the contractor to build the stage. Out of the 30 aerospace companies invited to a conference where the initial requirements were laid out, only seven submitted proposals a month later. Three of these were eliminated after their proposals had been investigated. However it was then decided that the initial specifications for the entire rocket were too small and so it was decided to increase the size of the stages used. This raised difficulties for the four remaining companies as NASA had still not yet decided on various aspects of the stage including size, and the upper stages that would be placed on top.

On September 11, 1961, the contract was awarded to North American Aviation (who were also awarded the contract for the Apollo Command/Service Module), with the manufacturing plant built by the government at Seal Beach, California. 15 flight stages were to be produced.

Plans were also developed to build 10 follow-on stages, S-II-16 through -25, but funding to assemble them never materialized. These stages would have supported later Apollo missions, including those of the Apollo Applications Program.

== Configuration ==
At the bottom was the thrust structure supporting five J-2 engines in a quincunx arrangement. The center engine was fixed, while the other four were gimballed, similar to the engines on the S-IC stage below.

Instead of using an intertank (empty container between tanks) like the S-IC, the S-II used a common bulkhead (similar to that of the S-IV and S-IVB stages) that included both the top of the LOX tank and bottom of the LH2 tank. It consisted of two aluminum sheets separated by a honeycomb structure made of phenolic resin. It insulated a 126 °F (70 °C) temperature differential between the two tanks. The use of a common bulkhead saved 3.6 tonnes in weight, both by eliminating one bulkhead and by reducing the overall length of the stage. The S-II's common bulkhead design was tested in 1965 on the subscale Common Bulkhead Test Tank (CBTT), made of only 2 LH2 tank cylinders.

Separation of the S-II stage from the S-IC first-stage - ground-camera view.

The LOX tank was an ellipsoidal container of 10 meters diameter and 6.7 meters high holding up to 83,000 US gallons (310 m^{3}) or 789,000 pounds (358 t) of oxidizer. It was formed by welding 12 gores (large triangular sections) and two circular pieces for the top and bottom. The gores were shaped by positioning in a 211,000-liter tank of water with three carefully orchestrated sets of underwater explosions to shape each gore.

S-II stage and separation from the S-IVB stage.

The LH2 tank was constructed of six cylinders: five were 2.4 meters high and the sixth was 0.69 meters high. The biggest challenge was the insulation. Liquid hydrogen must be kept colder than about 20 °C above absolute zero (−423 °F or 20.4 K or −252.8 °C) so good insulation is very important. Initial attempts did not work well: there were bonding issues and air pockets. Initially, the stage was insulated with a honeycomb material. These panels had grooves milled in the back which were purged with helium during filling. The final method was to spray insulation on by hand and trim the excess. This change saved both weight and time and avoided the issues with air pockets entirely. The LH2 tank volume was 260,000 US gallons (980 m^{3}) for storing 153,000 pounds (69 t) of liquid hydrogen.

The S-II was constructed vertically to aid welding and keep the large circular sections in the correct shape.

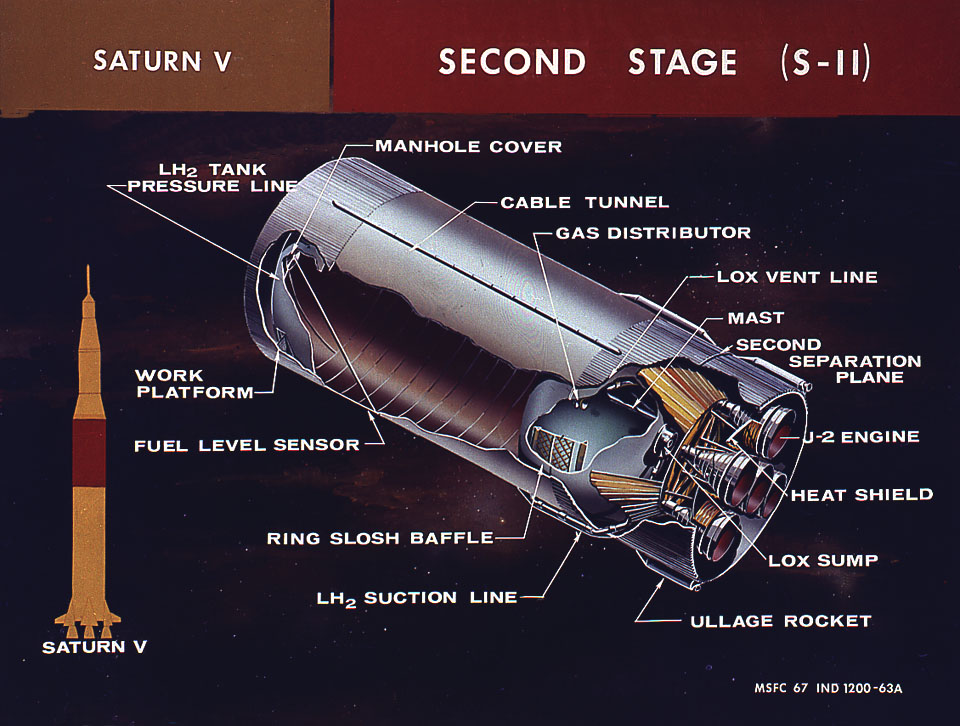
Cutaway illustration of the S-II (second) stage

== Stages built ==
Serial number	Use	Launch date	Current location	Notes	Image
Common Bulkhead Test Tank (CBTT)	Demonstrated S-II's common bulkhead on a subscale tank		Unknown	Subscale S-II tank assembly composed of two LH2 tank cylinders, a standard forward bulkhead, common dome, and aft skirt with a modified aft bulkhead. Tested in 1965.	
S-II-F	Used as Dynamic Test Stage replacement after destruction of S-II-S/D and S-II-T		At the U.S. Space & Rocket Center, Huntsville, Alabama; 34°42′38″N 86°39′26″W	Completed facilities checkouts and propellant load tests at Kennedy Space Center in 1966 as part of the SA-500F stack.	
S-II-T	"All-systems" test vehicle for engine firings			First all-up S-II stage, assembled between 1963 and 1965. Completed several engine tests at the Mississippi Test Facility (now the Stennis Space Center). Destroyed by accidental LH2 tank overpressurization during pressure testing May 28, 1966	
S-II-D	Dynamic test vehicle			Assembly canceled in 1965 to prioritize work on the first flight stage, S-II-1. Testing requirements transferred to S-II-S, which was renamed S-II-S/D.	
S-II-S/D	Structural and Dynamic Test Vehicle			Destroyed in test stand September 29, 1965	
S-II-1	Apollo 4	November 9, 1967	32°12′N 39°40′W	Carried "Camera Targets" spaced around the forward skirt and carried cameras to record first stage separation	
S-II-2	Apollo 6	April 4, 1968		Carried cameras to record first stage separation, similar to Apollo 4. Two engines failed during ascent due to damage from first stage pogo oscillation and incorrect engine control wiring.	
S-II-3	Apollo 8	December 21, 1968	31°50′N 38°0′W		
S-II-4	Apollo 9	March 3, 1969	31°28′N 34°2′W	1800 kg lighter allowing 600 kg more payload, more powerful engines and carried more LOX	
S-II-5	Apollo 10	May 18, 1969	31°31′N 34°31′W		
S-II-6	Apollo 11	July 16, 1969	31°32′N 34°51′W		
S-II-7	Apollo 12	November 14, 1969	31°28′N 34°13′W		
S-II-8	Apollo 13	April 11, 1970	32°19′N 33°17′W	Inboard engine failed during ascent due to pogo oscillation.	
S-II-9	Apollo 14	January 31, 1971			
S-II-10	Apollo 15	July 26, 1971			
S-II-11	Apollo 16	April 16, 1972			
S-II-12	Apollo 17	December 7, 1972			
S-II-13	Skylab 1	May 14, 1973	34°00′N 19°00′W	Modified to act as the terminal stage. The only S-II to enter earth orbit, made an uncontrolled reentry into the Atlantic on January 11, 1975. Interstage failed to separate due to payload damage during launch.	
S-II-14	Apollo 18 (cancelled)	N/A	Apollo-Saturn V Center, Kennedy Space Center; 28°31′26″N 80°41′00″W	From the cancelled Apollo 18 mission.	
S-II-15	Apollo 19, later Skylab 1 backup (not flown)	N/A	Johnson Space Center; 29°33′15″N 95°05′39″W	From SA-515 the Skylab backup vehicle which NASA did not use. Also earmarked for Apollo 19.	

== Proposed variants ==
Besides the early four engine version version intended as a Saturn I stage, other versions were proposed for several vehicle concepts:

=== Saturn S-II-4 ===
Four engine version planned as the Saturn C-4 second stage (1960 study).

=== Saturn S-II-8 ===
Eight engine version planned as the Saturn C-8 second stage (1960 study).

=== Saturn S-II-C3 ===
The S-II-C3 stage version was studied in 1960 for the Saturn C-3, consisted of four J-2 engines and had a height of 21.30 m and a diameter of 8.25 m. Planned thrust was 3,557.31 kN with a fueled mass of gross mass 204,044 kg.

=== Saturn II C-5A ===
A five engine common second stage planned for the Saturn C-5, Saturn C-3B, Saturn C-4B, Saturn C-3BN and Saturn C-5N (November 1961). Eventually developed into the Saturn V second stage.

=== Saturn MS-II-1 ===
A five engine version with a stretched fuel tank (1965 study), intended for the Saturn MLV-V-1, Saturn MLV-V-2 and Saturn MLV-V-4(S)-A.

=== Saturn MS-II-1-J-2T-200K ===
A five engine version using the uprated J-2T 200k and a stretched fuel tank (1965 study), intended for the Saturn MLV-V-1/J-2T/200K.

=== Saturn II-INT-17 ===
A seven HG-3-SL engine version (1965 study), intended for the Saturn INT-17.

=== Saturn II-SL ===
A five engine version using J-2-SL (1966 study), intended for the Saturn INT-19.

=== Saturn MS-II-1A ===
Seven engine concept with stretched propellant tanks (1966 study), intended for the Saturn MLV-V-1A and Saturn V-ELV.

=== Saturn MS-II-2 ===
Five HG-3 engine concept with stretched propellant tanks (1966 study), intended for the Saturn MLV-V-3 and Saturn V/4-260.

=== Saturn MS-II-1-J-2T-250K ===
Five J-2T 250k engine concept with stretched propellant tanks (1966 study), intended for the Saturn MLV-V-1/J-2T/250K and Saturn MLV-V-4(S)-B.

=== Saturn MS-II-3B ===
Five Toroidal 400k engine concept with stretched propellant tanks (1967 study), intended for the Saturn V-3B.

=== Saturn MS-II-4(S)B ===
Standard five engine S-II stage with structural strength increase, resulting in weight reduction (1968 study). Intended for the Saturn MLV-V-4(S), Saturn V-23(L), Saturn V-24(L), Saturn V-25(S)B, Saturn V-4X(U) and Saturn V-25(S)U.

== See also ==
- S-IC
- S-IVB
- Apollo (spacecraft)
- MS-II
