= HG-3 (rocket engine) =

Predecessor to the RS-25 thrust machine

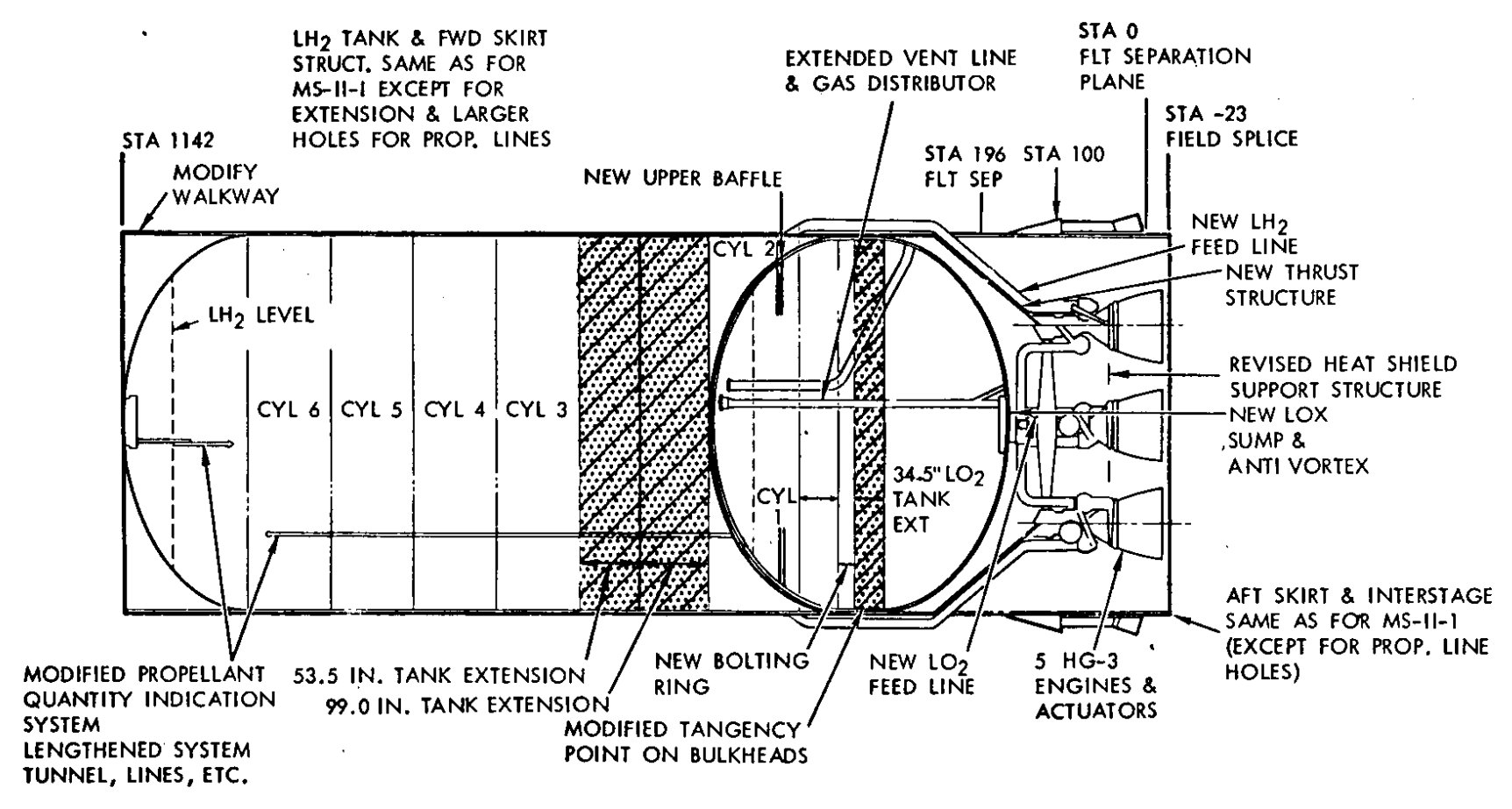
- MS-II-2 stage diagram, using five HG-3 engines
- Country of origin: United States
- Designer: MSFC/Rocketdyne
- Manufacturer: Rocketdyne
- Application: Upper stage engine
- Associated LV: Saturn MLV; Saturn IB-B; Saturn V/4-260; Saturn INT-17
- Predecessor: J-2
- Successor: RS-25
- Status: Canceled

Liquid-fuel engine
- Propellant: Liquid oxygen / Liquid hydrogen

Performance
- Thrust, vacuum: 1,400.7 kN (314,900 lb_{f})
- Thrust, sea-level: 869.6 kN (195,500 lb_{f})
- Specific impulse, vacuum: 451 seconds (4.42 km/s)
- Specific impulse, sea-level: 280 seconds (2.7 km/s)

The HG-3 was a liquid-fuel cryogenic rocket engine which was designed for use on the upper stages of Saturn rockets in the post-Apollo era. Designed in the United States by Rocketdyne, the HG-3 was to have burned cryogenic liquid hydrogen and liquid oxygen propellants, with each engine producing 1,400.7 kN (315,000 lb_{f}) of thrust during flight. The engine was designed to produce a specific impulse (I_{sp}) of 451 seconds (4.42 km/s) in a vacuum, or 280 seconds (2.7 km/s) at sea level.

Developed from Rocketdyne's J-2 engine used on the S-II and S-IVB stages, the engine was intended to replace the J-2 on the upgraded MS-II-2 and MS-IVB-2 stages intended for use on the Saturn MLV, Saturn IB-B and Saturn V/4-260 rockets, with a sea-level optimised version, the HG-3-SL, intended for use on the Saturn INT-17. The engine was cancelled, however, during the post-Apollo drawdown when development of the more advanced Saturn rockets ceased, and never flew, although the engine was later used as the basis for the design of the RS-25 engine.

== See also ==
- J-2X engine
