= Silverstein Committee =

1959 United States government commission on the Saturn program

The Saturn Vehicle Evaluation Committee, better known as the Silverstein Committee, was a US government commission assembled in 1959 to recommend specific directions that NASA could take with the Saturn rocket program. The committee was chaired by Abe Silverstein, a long-time NASA engineer, with the express intent of selecting upper stages for the Saturn after a disagreement broke out between the Air Force and Army over its development. During the meetings the Committee members outlined a number of different potential designs, including the low-risk solution von Braun was developing with existing ICBM airframes, as well as versions using entirely new upper stages developed to take full advantage of the booster stage. The advantages of using new uppers were so great that the committee won over an initially skeptical von Braun, and the future of the Saturn program changed forever.

== Background ==
In 1957 the Department of Defense (DoD) released a set of requirements for a new heavy-lift booster for missions starting in the early 1960s. At the time, all three branches of the US military were in the process of developing their own rockets, which led to considerable in-fighting between them on the priority of future developments. In 1956 the US Air Force won the concession that long range rocketry was its domain, including all ground-to-ground missiles over 200 miles (320 km) range. The agreement did not cover "other roles" however, and existing projects at the Navy and Army continued as before.

The Air Force was in the midst of their Dyna-Soar project, and were designing a new booster to launch it under their "SLV-4" requirement. Their primary answer to this requirement was a Titan II missile equipped with a new hydrogen-burning upper stage, the Titan C. The resulting design had a somewhat bulbous appearance; as the hydrogen fuel required large tanks, the upper stage was 160 inches (4,100 mm) in diameter, compared to the 120 inches (3,000 mm) of the Titan II. Other teams within the Air Force were also developing the Space Launcher System concept, which combined the same Titan II with a number of solid fuel rockets as a "zeroth stage". By combining different numbers and sizes of these rockets, the launch stack could be tuned to different payloads. The SLS team also outlined a development path for a crewed lunar mission under their Lunex Project proposal, using the Titan with four solids to test the re-entry vehicle from Earth orbit, and entirely new solids and liquid stages for flights to the Moon.

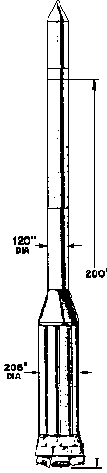
Saturn I configuration for Project Horizon (1959)

To meet the same DoD requirement for a heavy space launcher, the Army team at the Army Ballistic Missile Agency (ABMA) under the direction of a team led by Wernher von Braun studied a number of designs that clustered existing missile airframes and optionally added new engines. The design series included the "Super-Titan", "Super-Atlas" and "Super-Jupiter". The latter quickly became their focus, as it consisted of technology developed at ABMA, while the Atlas and Titan were Air Force designs suffering from extended development problems. The Super-Jupiter design was based almost entirely on existing equipment, using a cluster of Redstone and Jupiter missiles to form a lower stage powered by a new engine, with an upper stage adapted from the Titan. Their proposal was much simpler and lower-risk than the Air Force proposal, which required the development of a new hydrogen-burning upper stage. Like the Air Force team, ABMA also outlined their vision of a crewed lunar mission as Project Horizon, using fifteen of these rockets to build a large vehicle in Earth orbit.

The newly formed Advanced Research Projects Agency (ARPA), which was put in charge of development of the launcher, sided with the ABMA design. Their only concern was that the new engines might be a risk, suggesting that more moderate upgrades of existing engines be used instead. ABMA quickly adapted the design to use eight engines developed from the Jupiter's S-3D as the H-1, as opposed to four of the proposed E-1 of the original design. ARPA was satisfied, and started funding development of both the booster at ABMA and the new H-1 engines at Rocketdyne. Contracts were tendered in October 1958 and work proceeded quickly; the first test-firing of the H-1 occurred in December and a mock-up of the booster had already been completed. Originally known as Super-Jupiter, the design became the Juno V during development, and on February 3 an ARPA memorandum officially renamed the project Saturn.

Soon after, the newly formed NASA also expressed their interest in the Saturn design as part of their long-term strategy. Launches in the early 1960s would focus on low-Earth orbit using existing ICBMs as launchers, technology development for the lunar program would be based on Saturn, and the actual direct ascent lunar mission would use the massive Nova rocket, then under design at NASA. Shortly thereafter, on 9 June 1959, Herbert York, Director of the Department of Defense Research and Engineering, announced that he had decided to terminate the Saturn program. York felt that the DoD should not be funding a booster whose only concrete role was to support a civilian space program. A meeting was arranged to "save" the program, which resulted in the Saturn program, and all of ABMA with it, being transferred to NASA.

== Members and Directive ==
At the request of the Associate Administrator of NASA in November of 1959, the Director of Space Flight Development formed an inter-agency study group composed of members of NASA, the Directorate of Defense Research and Engineering, ARPA, ABMA, and the Air Force. These members were Abe Silverstein (NASA) as Chairman, then Col. N. Appold (USAF), A. Hyatt (NASA), T. C. Muse (ODDR&E), G. P. Sutton (ARPA), W. von Braun (ABMA), and E. Hall (NASA) as Secretary.

The request was for the group to formulate recommendations for the development of the Saturn rocket, specifically concerning selection of the upper stage configurations. The study was additionally tasked with focusing on four primary areas: determine the desired missions and payloads, identify potential problems with technical development, determine the cost and development time, and compare future growth in vehicle performance.^{[Note 1]}

== Selecting an upper stage ==
Nevertheless, the Air Force continued to agitate the development process. In December, ABMA, still part of the Army at this point, received an order to change the upper stage of the Saturn from the Titan-derived vehicle with a 120-inch diameter, to a new one with a 160-inch diameter that would require considerably more development. The 160-inch diameter stage was the same as the Titan C upper stage, and by making this change to the Saturn the DoD would have two competing upper stage designs for the SLV-4 requirement, as well as allowing Saturn to launch Dyna-Soar if the need arose. ABMA was already testing the engines for their Titan-derived upper stage, and was upset with this new request.

A meeting of all involved parties was arranged under the direction of Abe Silverstein, whose earlier efforts were instrumental in Saturn being selected for NASA missions. The group listed three missions for the initial Saturn vehicle: uncrewed lunar and deep space missions with an escape payload of about 10,000 pounds (4,500 kg); 5,000 pounds (2,300 kg) payloads to geostationary orbit; and crewed spacecraft missions of about 10,000 pounds (4,500 kg) in low orbits, such as Dyna-Soar.

To make such "high altitude" missions practical, the performance of the upper stages would be key. Every pound used in the stage or its fuel would mean that much less cargo, given any particular booster (first stage). Since it was the power-to-weight ratio that they needed, upper stages based on liquid hydrogen seemed to be the only way forward – the light weight of the fuel makes up for any difficulty handling it. The Saturn proposal had always included such a stage for orbital insertion, the Centaur, a hydrogen-burning stage derived from the Atlas ICBM.

For the intermediate stages the designers had somewhat more flexibility. The Committee members outlined a number of possible solutions grouped into three different classes: class "A," class "B," and class "C." Common among all three classes, with the exception of the proposed C-3, was the new first stage consisting of a cluster of eight H-1 engines attached to the Jupiter/Redstone tank cluster, which would become the S-I stage, as well as the two engine Centaur upper stage. The class "A" designs were the low-risk solutions; von Braun's current design became the A-1, consisting of a Titan I second stage between the S-I first stage and Centaur third stage. The A-2 replaced the second stage of the A-1 with a cluster of Thor IRBMs. Though the class "A" vehicles would have had the earliest flight availability due to the utilization of existing hardware, they failed to meet the first two mission for the Saturn rocket. Additionally, the 120-inch upper stages posed a potential structural weakness, and the proposed 160-inch upgrade would limit growth potential, violating fourth request of the original directive.

The single class "B" design considered by the committee, the B-1, consisted of a four-stage design with the aforementioned S-I first stage and Centaur fourth stage. The second stage would be an all-new 220-inch LOX/RP-1 design using four of the H-1 engines used by the first stage, along with a new four-engine third stage derived from Centaur but with a 220-inch diameter. Though the B-1 vehicle met the mission requirements, it would have been too costly and taken too much time to develop the new second stage.

The class "C" designs used liquid hydrogen in all upper stages. C-1 would consist of the existing S-I booster, a new Douglas Aircraft 220-inch S-IV stage powered by four upgraded versions of the Centaur engines with 15,000 lbf (67 kN) to 20,000 lbf (89 kN) thrust per engine, and a modified Centaur using the same engines as a third stage. The C-1 would become the C-2 upon insertion of a new S-III stage with two new 150,000 lbf (670 kN) to 200,000 lbf (890 kN) thrust engines, keeping the S-IV and Centaur on top. The C-3 was a similar adaptation, inserting the S-II stage with four of the same 150-200,000 lbf thrust engines, keeping the S-III and S-IV stages of the C-2, but eliminating the Centaur. The first stage of the C-3 would also be increased to over 2,000,000 lbf (8,900 kN) by either replacing the four center H-1 engines with one F-1 engine, or uprating all eight H-1 engines.

Saturn C variants

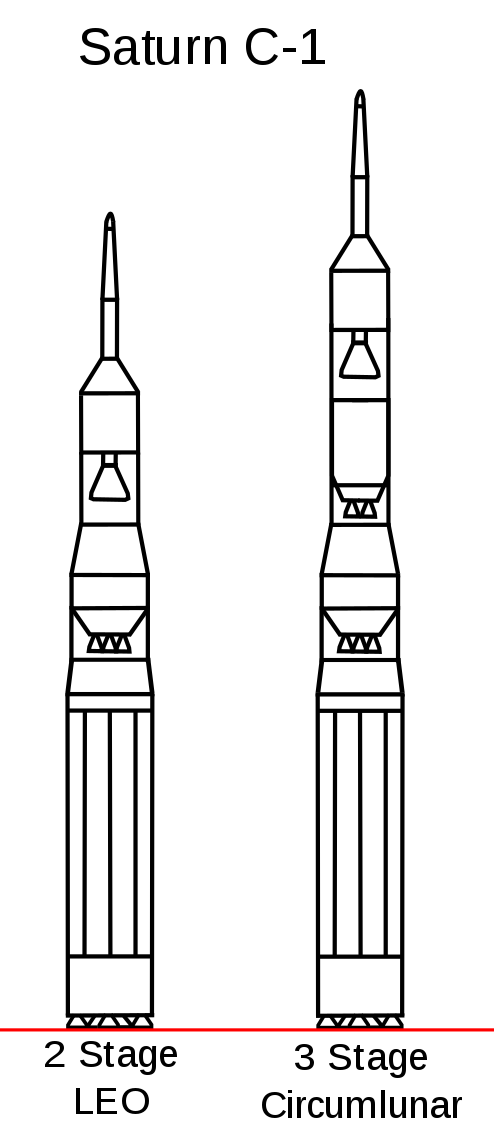
Saturn C-1

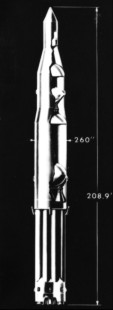
Saturn C-2

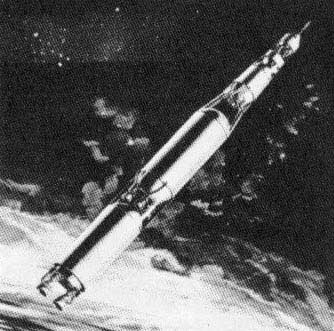
Saturn C-3

Examining the results strongly suggested that the C models were the only ones worth proceeding with, as they offered much higher performance than any other combination and offered great flexibility by allowing the stages to be mixed-and-matched for any particular launch need. Additionally, by developing the rocket in a building-block manner maximum vehicle reliability would be achieved as each new stage is added to already tested and proven stages.

Thus the decision came down not to performance, which was clearly settled, but development risk. The Saturn had always been designed to be as low-risk as possible, the only really new components being a minor upgrade to the engine for the lower stage and the Centaur as the upper stage. Developing entirely new hydrogen-burning stages for the entire "stack" would increase the risk that a failure of any one of the components could disrupt the entire program. But as the Committee members noted: "If these propellants are to be accepted for the difficult top-stage applications, there seems to be no valid engineering reasons for not accepting the use of high-energy propellants for the less difficult application to intermediate stages." von Braun was won over; development of the current design would continue as a back-up, but the future of the Saturn was based on hydrogen and was tailored solely to NASA's requirements.

On the last day of 1959, NASA Administrator T. Keith Glennan approved the Silverstein recommendations. Chances of meeting the schedule improved with two Eisenhower administration decisions in January 1960. The Saturn project received a DX rating, which designated a program of highest national priority, which gave program managers privileged status in securing scarce materials. More important, the administration agreed to NASA's request for additional funds. The Saturn FY 1961 budget was increased from $140 million to $230 million. On 15 March 1960 President Eisenhower officially announced the transfer of the Army's Development Operations Division to NASA.

== Saturn emerges ==
The Saturn C vehicles imagined in the Silverstein Committee report were never built. As soon as the Saturn became a NASA-tuned design of high performance, the DoD became less interested in it for their own needs. Development of the Titan continued for these roles, and as a result the flexibility offered by the variety of Saturn C-model intermediate stages simply wasn't needed, and were eventually abandoned.

All that survived of the recommendation was the S-I first stage and the smallest of the new upper stages, the S-IV. It was originally intended that the S-IV would be equipped with four upgraded Centaur engines, but to decrease risk it was decided to use the existing engines and increase their number from four to six. A new, larger engine, the J-2, was already in the pipeline that could replace these. The original S-IV design, the 220-inch with six engines, was used only for a short period until a larger diameter 260-inch version was created for the Saturn Block II models, and then finally replaced with the J-2 powered S-IVB of the Saturn IB.

== Notes ==
1. The full text of the request can be found in the Appendix of the Semiannual Technical Summary Report on ARPA Orders 14-59 and 47-59.

Until 1963 Saturns were classified by a C and an Arabic numeral. People generally assume that C stood for configuration; but according to Kennedy Space Center's Spaceport News (17 January 1963), MSFC engineers used it to designate vehicular "concepts." Saturn C-1 denoted the concept of the S-1 booster topped with upper stages using liquid hydrogen as a propellant. C-2, C-3, and C-4 were drawing-board concepts that preceded the C-5 (Saturn V) Moon rocket. For additional information on the origins of Saturn, see John L. Sloop, Liquid Hydrogen as a Propulsion Fuel, 1945-1959, NASA SP-4404, in press, chap. 12.
