= Saturn A-2 =

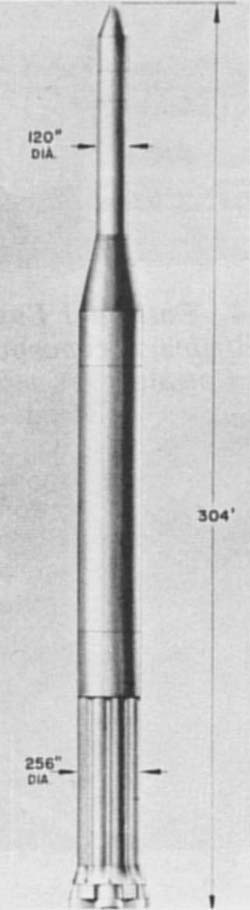
- Function: Uncrewed launch vehicle
- Manufacturer: Von Braun
- Country of origin: United States

Size
- Height: 62 m (203.00 ft)
- Diameter: 6.52 m (21.39 ft)
- Mass: 524,484 kg
- Stages: 3 (all used on various vehicles, now retired)

Capacity
- Payload to LEO: 10,000 kg

Launch history
- Status: Never flown
- Launch sites: N/A

First stage - S-IB
- Engines: 8 × Rocketdyne H-1
- Thrust: 1,600,000 lbf (7,100 kN)
- Burn time: 150 seconds
- Propellant: RP-1/LOX

Second stage Jupiter Cluster
- Engines: 4 x Rocketdyne LR79
- Thrust: 3,034.285 kN
- Burn time: 172 seconds
- Propellant: RP-1/LOX

Third stage - Centaur C
- Engines: 2 RL10A-1
- Thrust: 133 kN
- Burn time: 430 seconds
- Propellant: LH_{2}

Studied with the Saturn A-1 in 1959, the Saturn A-2 was deemed more powerful than the Saturn I rocket. It was proposed as a launcher for Project Horizon, a scientific / military base on the Moon project, at a time when the U.S. Department of the Army, Department of the Navy, and Department of the Air Force had total responsibility for U.S. space program plans.

The rocket consisting of a S-IB first stage with eight H-1 engines (which actually flew on the Saturn IB), a Jupiter Cluster second stage equipped which four LR79 engines (used on the Jupiter IRBM) and a Centaur C high-energy liquid-fueled third stage with a double RL10A-1 engine.

== See also ==
- S-I
- Saturn I
- Juno V
- Titan I
- Centaur
- Project Horizon
