= Saturn C-2 =

Proposed American orbital launcher

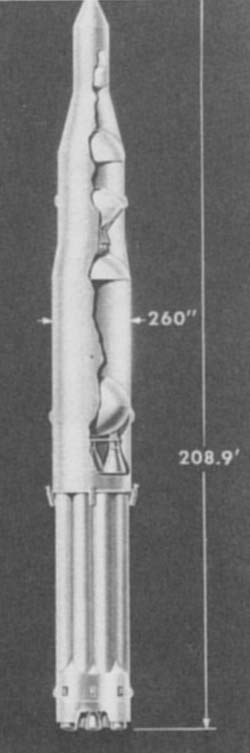
- Saturn C-2 diagram, 1959
- Function: Launch vehicle for Project Horizon and Apollo
- Country of origin: United States

Size
- Height: 224.6 feet (68.5 m) (w/o payload)
- Diameter: 21.4 feet (6.5 m)
- Mass: 1,367,000 pounds (620,000 kg) gross (to LEO)

Capacity

Payload to LEO
- Mass: 47,300 pounds (21,500 kg)

Payload to Moon
- Mass: 14,900 pounds (6,800 kg)

Associated rockets
- Family: Saturn

Launch history
- Status: Study, not developed
- Launch sites: Kennedy Space Center

First stage – S-I
- Height: 80.3 feet (24.5 m)
- Diameter: 21.4 feet (6.5 m)
- Empty mass: 99,800 pounds (45,300 kg)
- Gross mass: 953,900 pounds (432,700 kg)
- Powered by: 8 H-1
- Maximum thrust: 1,500,000 pounds-force (6,700 kN)
- Specific impulse: 289 secs
- Burn time: 150 seconds
- Propellant: RP-1 / LOX

Second stage – S-II
- Height: 74.0 feet (22.6 m)
- Diameter: 21.6 feet (6.6 m)
- Empty mass: 30,000 pounds (14,000 kg)
- Gross mass: 220,000 pounds (100,000 kg)
- Powered by: 4 J-2
- Maximum thrust: 800,000 pounds-force (3,600 kN)
- Specific impulse: 300 sec
- Burn time: 100 seconds
- Propellant: LH_{2} / LOX

Third stage – S-IV
- Height: 40.0 feet (12.2 m)
- Diameter: 18.0 feet (5.5 m)
- Empty mass: 11,500 pounds (5,200 kg)
- Gross mass: 111,500 pounds (50,600 kg)
- Powered by: 6 RL10
- Maximum thrust: 90,000 pounds-force (400 kN)
- Specific impulse: 410 secs
- Burn time: 482 seconds
- Propellant: LH_{2} / LOX

Fourth stage – S-V (Centaur-C)
- Height: 30.0 feet (9.1 m)
- Diameter: 10.0 feet (3.0 m)
- Empty mass: 4,400 pounds (2,000 kg)
- Gross mass: 34,300 pounds (15,600 kg)
- Powered by: 2 RL10
- Maximum thrust: 30,000 pounds-force (130 kN)
- Specific impulse: 410 secs
- Burn time: 430 seconds
- Propellant: LH_{2} / LOX

The Saturn C-2 was the second rocket in the Saturn C series studied from 1959 to 1962. The design was for a four-stage launch vehicle that could launch 21,500 kg (47,300 lb) to low Earth orbit and send 6,800 kg (14,900 lb) to the Moon via Trans-Lunar Injection.

The C-2 design concept was for a proposed crewed circumlunar flight and the Earth orbit rendezvous (EOR) missions. It was initially considered for the Apollo lunar landing at the earliest possible date (1967).

== Launch vehicle requirements ==
On 30 September 1960, the fourth meeting of the Space Exploration Program Council was held at NASA Headquarters. The results of a study on Saturn development and utilization were presented by the Ad Hoc Saturn Study Committee.

Objectives of the study were to determine:

- If and when the Saturn C-2 launch vehicle should be developed.
- If mission and spacecraft planning was consistent with the Saturn vehicle development schedule.

Since no change in the NASA FY1962 budget was contemplated, the Committee recommended that the Saturn C-2 development should proceed on schedule (S-II stage contract in FY 1962, with first flight in 1965).

The C-2 would be essential for Apollo crewed circumlunar missions, lunar uncrewed exploration, Mars and Venus orbiters and capsule landers, probes to other planets and out-of-ecliptic, and for orbital starting of nuclear upper stages. During a discussion on the Saturn program, several major problems were brought up:

- The adequacy of the Saturn C-1 launch vehicle for the orbital qualification of the complete Apollo spacecraft was in question. Although the C-1 could be used to launch a command module of 5,100 pounds, it was probable that the command module weight would increase to as much as 8,000 pounds, George Low of NASA Headquarters, in a critical review of the Apollo program, pointed out that a spacecraft for a circumlunar mission could be constructed within the payload limit of the C-2 launch vehicle. Both the developmental and production spacecraft could be available to meet the Saturn schedules.
- Much basic research would be needed before the first Apollo flight, In particular, the problem of reentry heating was of great concern. Low noted that a prediction criterion for proton beam events had been developed, making possible safe crewed circumlunar flights insofar as the radiation exposure problem was concerned.
- Concern was also expressed as to the possible need and availability of additional personnel to support the Apollo program.

== Changing configurations ==
During 1961 Saturn C-x configurations seemed to change month by month. In February 1961, the C-2 design finalized as a three-stage vehicle for Earth-escape missions, using an S-II second stage. It was calculated that 15 launches and rendezvous of the C-2 would have been required to assemble a lunar spacecraft in Low Earth orbit. By May 1961, a more powerful vehicle was desired for circumlunar missions, hence the C-2 was dropped in favor of the Saturn C-3. Further development of the C-2 vehicle was cancelled on 23 June 1961.

== Launch vehicle design ==
The original Saturn C-2 design (1959–1960) was a four-stage launch vehicle, using an S-I first stage with eight Rocketdyne H-1 engines, later flown on the Saturn I. The Army's original design used the S-III stage with two J-2 engines as the second stage; after the Saturn program was transferred to NASA, the second stage was replaced with an S-II second stage using four J-2 engines. The S-III stage would have been added atop the S-II, to convert the C-2 into the five-stage Saturn C-3. Later, a fifth J-2 engine was added to the S-II stage to be used on the Saturn C-5, which eventually was developed as the Saturn V launch vehicle.

The S-IV, later flown on the Saturn I, was to serve as the third C-2 stage and fourth C-3 stage; and an S-V Centaur would be the fourth C-2 stage. While this S-V/Centaur stage would never fly on any Saturn rockets, it would be used on Atlas and Titan launch vehicles. Modern versions of the Centaur are still in use on Atlas V and Vulcan.

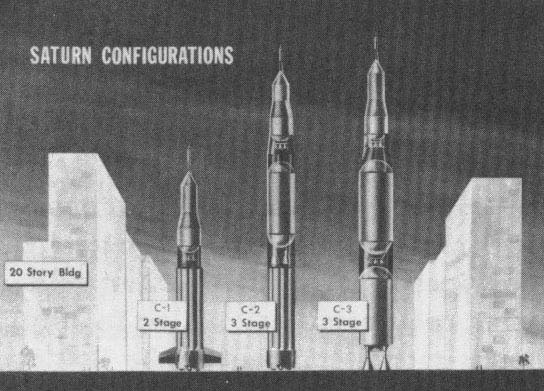
Saturn stage configurations, 1961

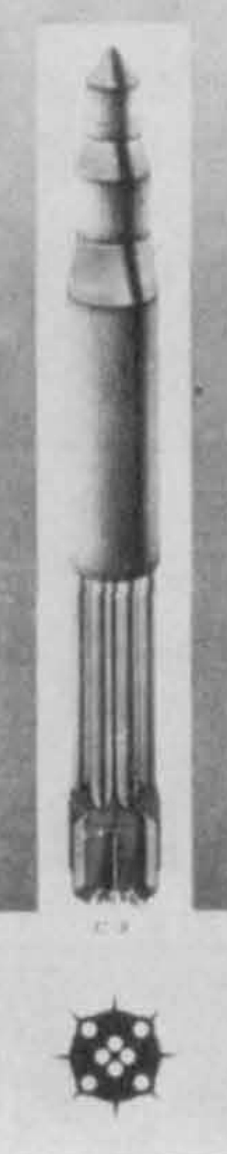
Saturn C-2 diagram

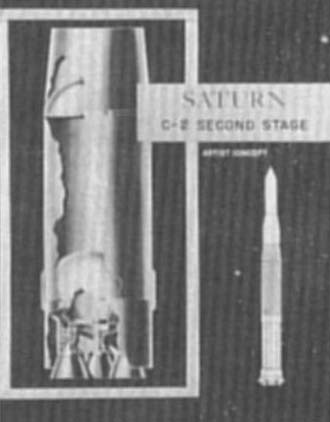
S-II stage, 1959

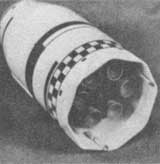
S-IV stage, 6 engine configuration, 1961

S-V stage illustration
