= S-III =

Proposed rocket stage in Saturn C vehicle

- Country of origin: United States
- Used on: Saturn C-2 (stage 2); Saturn C-3 (stage 3)

General characteristics
- Diameter: 27 ft (8.2 m)

S-III
- Powered by: 2 J-2 engine
- Maximum thrust: 400,000 lbf (1.8 MN)
- Propellant: LOX/LH2

The S-III (pronounced "S 3") was a proposed third stage of the early Saturn C designs for a five-stage Saturn launch vehicle. The Saturn C configurations were based on a "building block" approach, in which the upper stages would be test-flown before the intermediate stages. The S-III was to have been fueled with liquid oxygen and liquid hydrogen and powered by two J-2 engines. The original Saturn C-2 design would have been a three- or four-stage launch vehicle using the S-I plus S-III plus S-IV stages plus, for some missions, S-V.
