= ODOP =

Radar tracking system

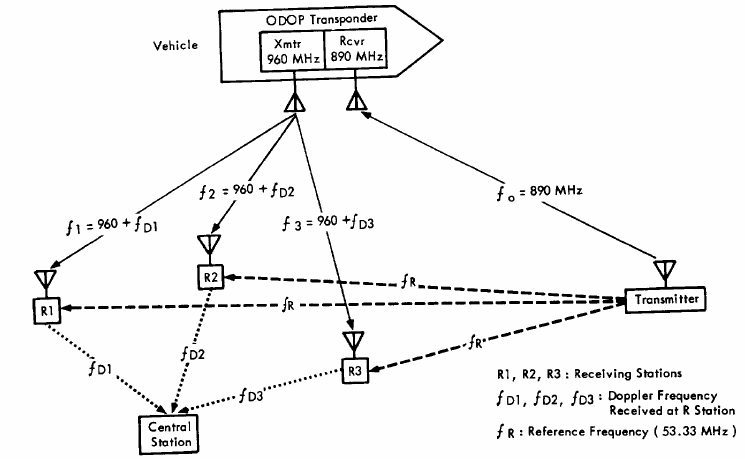
ODOP Doppler radar tracking system functional block diagram.

The ODOP (Offset DOPpler) radar tracking system is essentially the same as the UDOP system used for many years at the Atlantic Missile Range, but ODOP operates at different frequencies. It is a phase-coherent, multistation Doppler tracking system which measures the position of a vehicle equipped with the ODOP transponder. ODOP stations are located at and around Cape Kennedy. The ODOP transponder is carried in the first stage (S-IB or S-IC) of the Saturn vehicles and, therefore, ODOP tracking data is limited to the flight of the first stage only. The ODOP tracking system provides data immediately following lift-off while other tracking systems cannot "see" the vehicle or their accuracy is reduced by multipath propagation during the early phase of the flight.

The ODOP system is a radar interferometer tracking system which determines the position of a vehicle-borne transponder. The ground transmitter radiates a CW signal of 890 MHz to the transponder in the vehicle. The transponder shifts the received signal in frequency by 70 MHz and retransmits it to the receiving stations (R1, R2, R3). The signal from the transponder received at the ground stations contains a 2-way Doppler shift f_{D} which is extracted by mixing the received signal (f_{i} = 960 MHz + f_{D}) with the reference frequency (f_{R} = 960 MHz) derived from the transmitter frequency. Actually, a reference frequency of 53.33 MHz is transmitted over a VHF link to each transmitter station and then multiplied by a factor of 18, yielding 959.94 MHz. When this frequency is combined with the signal received from the transponder, the Doppler shift is obtained with a 60 kHz bias frequency (60 kHz + f_{D}). The UDOP system used a transmitter frequency of 450 MHz which was doubled in the transponder (900 MHz). The higher frequency in the ODOP system (890 MHz versus 450 MHz) is less affected by the ionosphere and the result is increased tracking accuracy.

The Doppler frequencies, f_{D}, (including the bias frequency) from all receiving stations are transmitted to the central station and recorded on magnetic tape. Integration of the Doppler frequency received at a particular station provides the range sum, i.e., the distance transmitter-transponder receiver. At least three range sums (for three different stations) are necessary to compute the position of the vehicle (transponder). The ODOP system uses 20 receiver stations around Cape Kennedy for redundancy and optimum tracking geometry. ODOP tracking data is not available in real time but is obtained from post-flight evaluation.

== ODOP transponder ==
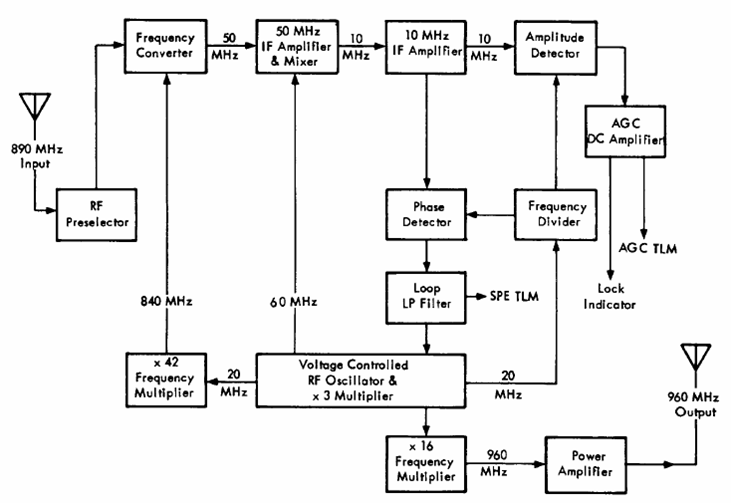
ODOP transponder functional diagram.

The ODOP transponder is a modified version of the transponder used by the Jet Propulsion Laboratory in the Ranger vehicles. Separate antennas are used for the receiver and the transmitter. The transponder consists of a double superheterodyne receiver (890 MHz) and a transmitter (960 MHz). The signal transmitted from the transponder is phase-coherent with the signal received by the transponder. Phase coherence is accomplished by an automatic phase tracking loop. The transponder is completely transistorized.

== ODOP system characteristics ==
ODOP system characteristics
Ground Transmitter
Frequency	890 MHz
Transponder
Receiver frequency	890 MHz
Receiver noise figure	14 dB
Receiver threshold sensitivity	−132 dBm
Predetection bandwidth	100 kHz
Threshold noise bandwidth	600 Hz
Strong signal noise bandwidth	1400 Hz
Transmitted frequency	960 MHz
Transmitter power	1 watt
Required 28 VDC power	36 watts
Weight	10.25 kg (23.0 lb)
Size	7370 cm^{3} (448 in^{3})
Ground Receiving station
Frequency	960 MHz
