= S3D =

S3D or S-3D may refer to:

- Stereoscopic 3D, see stereoscopy
  - 3D film, films with S-3D
  - Stereoscopic video game, video games with S-3D
- S3D, a supercomputer project that models the molecular physics of combustion
- S3D, a diode electrical component
- Rocketdyne S-3D, a rocket engine used in early US ballistic missiles
