= Jarvis (rocket) =

Proposed US medium-lift launch vehicle

- Manufacturer: Hughes Aircraft / Boeing
- Country of origin: United States

Size
- Height: 58 m (190 ft)
- Diameter: 8.38 m (27.5 ft)
- Mass: 1,154,000 kg (2,544,000 lb)
- Stages: 3

Capacity

Payload to LEO
- Mass: 38,000 kg (84,000 lb)

Payload to GTO
- Mass: 13,000 kg (29,000 lb)

Launch history
- Status: None built
- Total launches: 0

First stage
- Powered by: 2x F-1
- Maximum thrust: 15,481.26 kN (3,480,330 lbf)
- Specific impulse: 304 seconds (vacuum)
- Burn time: 170 seconds
- Propellant: RP-1 / LOX

Second stage
- Powered by: 1x J-2
- Maximum thrust: 1,031.98 kN (232,000 lbf)
- Specific impulse: 425 seconds (vacuum)
- Burn time: 525 seconds
- Propellant: LH_{2} / LOX

Third stage
- Powered by: 8x R-4D
- Maximum thrust: 3.92 kN (880 lbf)
- Specific impulse: 312 seconds
- Propellant: MMH / N_{2}O_{4}

Jarvis was a proposed American medium-lift launch vehicle for space launch, designed by Hughes Aircraft and Boeing during the mid-1980s as part of the joint United States Air Force (USAF)/National Aeronautics and Space Administration (NASA) Advanced Launch System (ALS) study. Intended to utilize engines and tooling in storage from the Saturn V rocket program along with Space Shuttle components, and projected to be capable of carrying up to six satellites into multiple orbits using a single launch (e.g. GPS constellation), the proposal failed to meet the ALS requirements, and the Jarvis rocket was never built.

== History ==
Jointly proposed by Hughes and Boeing as a heavy-lift rocket, using propulsion systems and equipment built for the Saturn V rocket and placed in storage at the end of the Apollo program, as well as Space Shuttle components, Jarvis was intended to be capable of launching multiple GPS satellites, major components of the planned Space Station Freedom and commercial satellites. The rocket was named after Hughes employee and NASA mission specialist Gregory Jarvis, who died in the Space Shuttle Challenger disaster in January 1986.

Submitted as part of the Advanced Launch System studies jointly conducted by the United States Air Force and NASA for a new heavy-lift rocket system capable of substituting for the Space Shuttle and expanding upon its capabilities, Jarvis was planned as a three-stage rocket capable of launching a payload of up to 83,000 pounds (38,000 kg) to low Earth orbit, or 28,000 pounds (13,000 kg) to geosynchronous orbit; the rocket was projected to cost under $300 million USD per launch; some estimates had a per-launch cost of the Jarvis vehicle at a cost as low as $150 million each, with $1 billion being cited as the projected development cost of the rocket system.

The first stage of the Jarvis vehicle was designed to use two Rocketdyne F-1 engines, powered by RP-1 rocket fuel and liquid oxygen (LOX); these were the same engines used by the Saturn V's first stage. The second stage would use a single Rocketdyne J-2 LOX/liquid hydrogen (LH2) engine, while the third stage was intended to utilise eight Marquardt R-4D reaction control system thrusters, fueled by a hypergolic mix of nitrogen tetroxide and monomethylhydrazine (N_{2}O_{4}/MMH), to provide final boost, and to allow for the deployment of multiple payloads into different orbits. Jarvis was designed to be capable of carrying payloads of up to 26 feet (7.9 m) in diameter; as many as six satellites could be carried on a single rocket, and it was suggested that the Global Positioning System (GPS) constellation be deployed in this manner.

While the Hughes proposal for the "Jarvis" would have been powered by a pair of Saturn V F-1 engines, when Boeing joined the proposal they quickly shifted the proposal toward a Shuttle-derived in-line design consisting of an External Tank powered by a single aft-mounted Space Shuttle Main Engine (SSME) augmented by a pair of Solid Rocket Boosters. This Revised Jarvis would be able to lift 80,000 pounds (36,000 kg) to LEO.

Although Hughes received an Air Force contract to study the Jarvis vehicle, the Jarvis failed to meet the Air Force's requirements for the ALS, being too large in size compared to the specification. In 1986, Hughes stated that the rocket could be operational by the 1990s, with launches beginning two years after project go-ahead; however the U.S. Air Force rejected the Hughes-Boeing proposal. Consideration was given to continuing the Jarvis project as a private venture, and the Jarvis was mentioned as meeting the requirements for a launch vehicle to be used in the establishment of a lunar base in a 1992 conference on the subject, however nothing further came of the proposal, while the entire Advanced Launch System development effort was scaled back into the National Launch System before being cancelled in 1992.

== See also ==
- New Glenn
- Saturn C-3
- Saturn INT-20
- Saturn II
