= S-IB =

First stage of the Saturn IB rocket

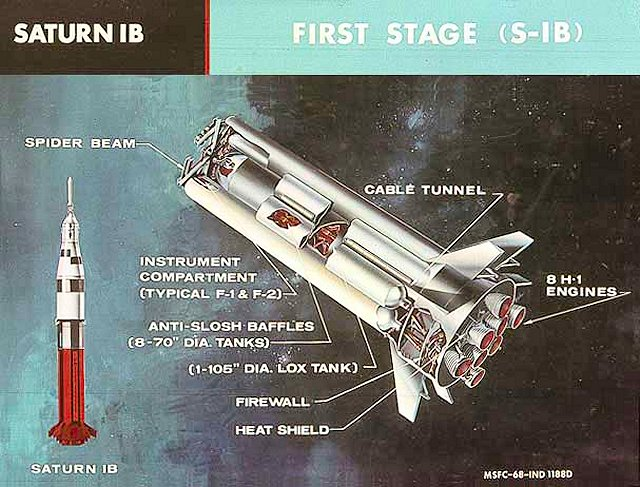
- Diagram of the S-IB first stage of the Saturn IB rocket
- Manufacturer: Chrysler
- Country of origin: United States
- Used on: Saturn IB (stage 1)

General characteristics
- Height: 25.5 m (84 ft)
- Diameter: 6.6 m (22 ft)
- Gross mass: 448,648 kg (989,100 lb)
- Derived from: S-I

Launch history
- Status: Retired
- Total launches: 9
- Successes (stage only): 9
- First flight: February 26, 1966
- Last flight: July 15, 1975
- Powered by: 8 H-1 engines
- Maximum thrust: 7.1 MN (1,600,000 lbf)
- Specific impulse: 296 s (2.90 km/s)
- Burn time: 155 seconds
- Propellant: RP-1/LOX

The S-IB stage was the first stage of the Saturn IB launch vehicle, which was used for Earth orbital missions. It was an upgraded version of the S-I stage used on the earlier Saturn I rocket and was composed of nine propellant containers, eight fins, a thrust structure assembly, eight H-1 rocket engines, and many other components. It also contained the ODOP transponder. The propellant containers consisted of eight Redstone-derived tanks (four holding liquid oxygen (LOX) and four holding RP-1) clustered around a Jupiter rocket-derived tank containing LOX. The four outboard engines gimballed to steer the rocket in flight, which required a few more engine components. The S-IB burned for nearly 2.5 minutes before separating at an altitude of 42 miles (68 km).

== Specifications ==
- Height: 80.17 ft (24.44 m)
- Diameter: 21.42 ft (6.53 m)
- Number of fins: 8
- Finspan: 39.42 ft (12.02 m)
- Engines: 8 Rocketdyne H-1
- Thrust: 1,600,000 lbf (7,100 kN)
- Fuel: RP-1 (Refined kerosene) 41,000 US gal (155 m^{3})
- Oxidizer: Liquid oxygen (LOX) 66,277 US gal (251 m^{3}) nominal capacity including 1.5% ullage volume (43,284 US gal / 163 m^{3} in four outer tanks plus 22,993 US gal / 87 m^{3} in center tank)
- Burn time: 2.5 min
- Burnout altitude: 37 nmi (69 km)

== Stages built ==
Apollo flights:

- S-IB-1: Launched 2/26/1966 on suborbital AS-201 mission.
- S-IB-3: Launched 7/5/1966 as AS-203 orbital test mission.
- S-IB-2: Launched 8/25/1966 on suborbital AS-202 test mission.
- S-IB-4: Launched 1/22/1968 on Apollo 5 orbital mission.
- S-IB-5: Launched 10/11/1968 on crewed Apollo 7 orbital mission.

Post-Apollo Flights:

- S-IB-6: Launched 5/25/1973 on Skylab-2 orbital mission.
- S-IB-7: Launched 7/23/1973 on Skylab-3 orbital mission.
- S-IB-8: Launched 11/16/1973 on Skylab-4 orbital mission.
- S-IB-10: Launched 7/15/1975 on ASTP orbital mission.

Hardware Not Flown:

- S-IB-9: Stacked on MLP ready to fly as Skylab backup. Now on display at Kennedy Space Center Visitor Complex.
- S-IB-11: Flight not assigned. Displayed vertically at Alabama Welcome Center until late 2023, when it was dismantled due to weathering.
- S-IB-12: Flight not assigned. Presumed scrapped at Marshall Space Flight Center in late 1970s.
- S-IB-13: Hardware scrapped.
- S-IB-14: Hardware scrapped.
- S-IB-15: Not built, cancelled by NASA in 1968.
- S-IB-16: Not built, cancelled by NASA in 1968.

== Proposed variants ==
Besides the version flown as the Saturn IB stage, other versions were proposed for several vehicle concepts:

=== Saturn S-IB-2 ===
The S-IB-2 stage was studied in 1960 to power the Saturn C-3. It was planned to be larger (with a height of 34.50 m and a diameter of 8.25 m), powered by two F-1 engines developing 3 million pounds-force (13 MN) of thrust, with a fueled mass of 1.6 million pounds (730 t).

=== Saturn S-IB-4 ===
The S-IB-4 stage was studied in 1960 to power the Saturn C-4, using four F-1 engines.

=== Saturn S-IB-A ===
The S-IB-A stage was studied in 1965 to power the Saturn IB-A and Saturn IB-B, using eight H-1c engines.

=== Saturn IB-11 ===
The IB-11 stage was studied in 1966 to power the Saturn INT-11, Saturn INT-13 and Saturn INT-14, using eight H-1b engines and UA1207 solid boosters.

=== Saturn IB-15 ===
The IB-15 stage was studied in 1966 to power the Saturn INT-15, using eight H-1b engines and Minuteman first-stage strap-ons.

=== Saturn S-1B-4 ===
The S-1B-4 stage was studied in 1966 to power the Saturn INT-12, using four H-1b engines and UA1205 solid boosters.
