= Saturn A-1 =

Rocket

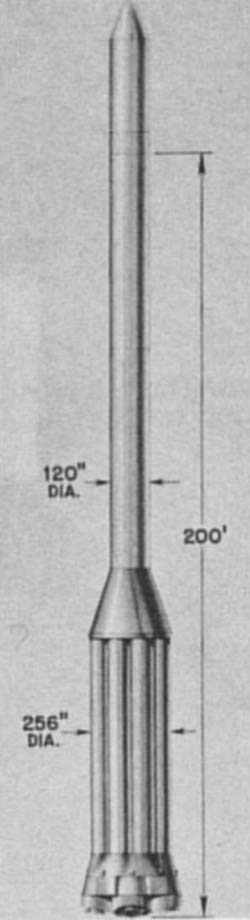
- Function: Uncrewed launch vehicle
- Manufacturer: Von Braun
- Country of origin: United States

Size
- Height: 49.62 m (162.29 ft)
- Diameter: 6.52 m (21.39 ft)
- Mass: 524,484 kg
- Stages: 3 (all used on various vehicles, now retired)

Capacity

Payload to low Earth orbit
- Mass: 13,600 kg (30,000 lb)

for LEO

Launch history
- Status: Never flown
- Launch sites: N/A

First stage - S-I
- Engines: 8 H-1
- Thrust: 7,582 kN
- Burn time: 150 seconds
- Propellant: RP-1/LOX

Second stage Titan I
- Engines: 2 LR-87-3
- Thrust: 1,467 kN
- Burn time: 138 seconds
- Propellant: RP-1/LOX

Third stage - Centaur C
- Engines: 2 RL-10A-1
- Thrust: 133 kN
- Burn time: 430 seconds
- Propellant: LH_{2} / LOX

Saturn A-1, studied in 1959, was projected to be the first version of Saturn I and was to be used if necessary before the S-IV liquid hydrogen second stage became available. It was proposed as a launcher for Project Horizon, a scientific / military base on the Moon project, at a time when the U.S. Department of the Army, Department of the Navy, and Department of the Air Force had total responsibility for U.S. space program plans.

The rocket was designed as a three stage vehicle. The S-I first stage (initially proposed for the Juno V rocket and eventually used on Saturn I) with eight H-1 engines would propel the Saturn A-1 into space, continuing the flight with a Titan I missile based second stage with two LR-87-3 engines. Finally a Centaur C high-energy double RL-10A-1 engine third stage could send a payload into its final Earth orbit or to other planets.

The Saturn A-1 never flew, but all proposed stages were used on different launch vehicles. Today, they are all retired.

== See also ==
- S-I
- Saturn I
- Juno V
- Titan I
- Centaur
- Project Horizon
