= Saturn C-4 =

Proposed NASA super-heavy-lift rocket

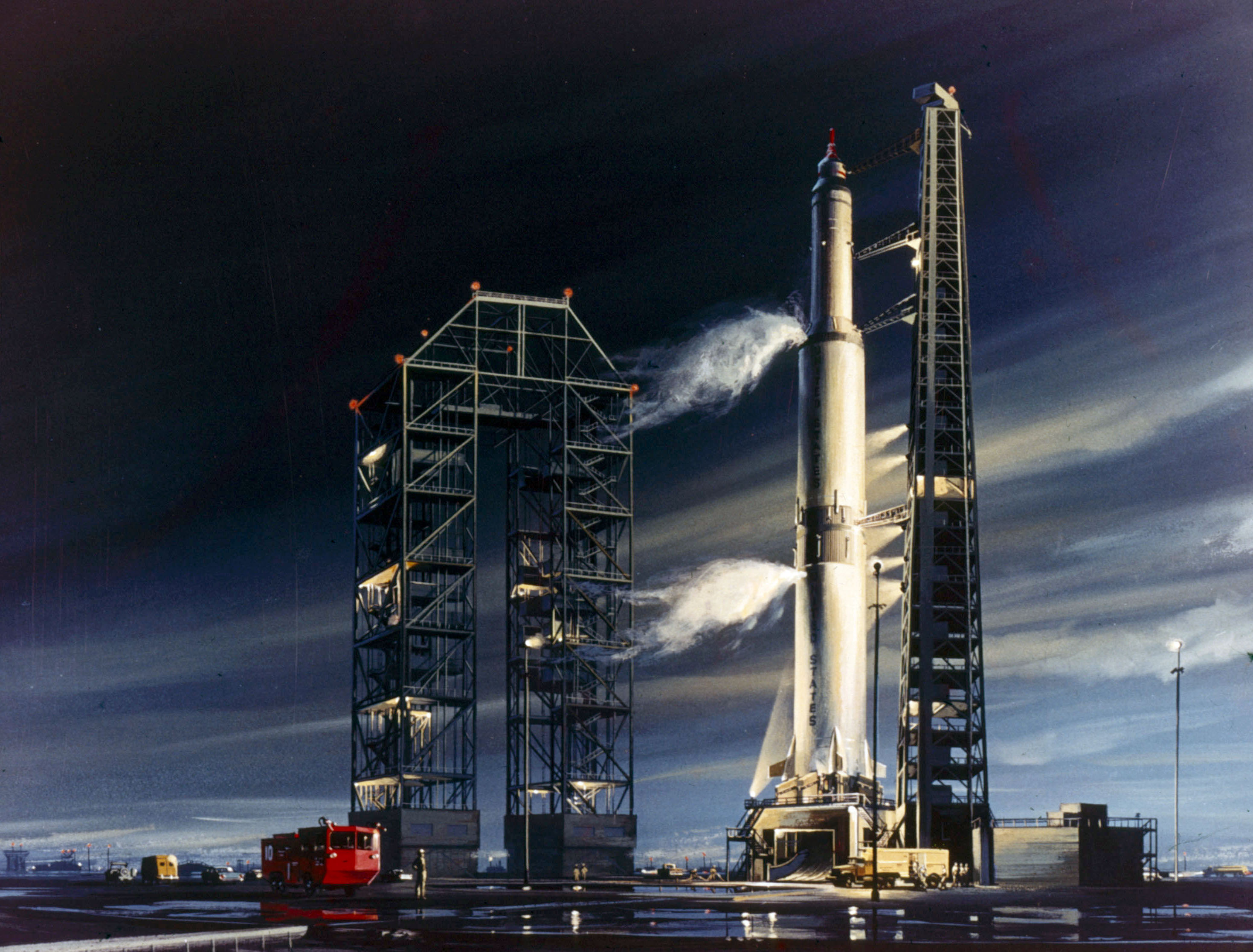
- Saturn C-4B on pad
- Function: LEO and Lunar launch vehicle
- Manufacturer: Boeing (S-IB); North American (S-II); Douglas (S-IV)
- Country of origin: United States
- Cost per launch: 43.5 million
- Cost per year: 1985

Size
- Height: 269.0 ft (82.0 m)
- Diameter: 320 in (8.1 m)
- Mass: 1,023,670 lb (464,330 kg)
- Stages: 3

Capacity

Payload to LEO
- Mass: 218,000 lb (99,000 kg)

Payload to TLI
- Mass: 70,000 lb (32,000 kg)

Associated rockets
- Family: Saturn
- Comparable: Saturn V

Launch history
- Status: Proposed (1962)
- Launch sites: planned SLC 37, LC-39; Kennedy Space Center

First stage – S-IB-4
- Height: 113.10 ft (34.47 m)
- Diameter: 320 in (8.1 m)
- Empty mass: 149,945 lb (68,014 kg)
- Gross mass: 1,599,433 lb (725,491 kg)
- Powered by: 4 Rocketdyne F-1
- Maximum thrust: 6,000,000 lbf (27,000 kN)
- Specific impulse: 265 sec (sea level)
- Burn time: 139 seconds
- Propellant: RP-1/LOX

Second stage – S-II-4
- Height: 69.80 ft (21.28 m)
- Diameter: 320 in (8.1 m)
- Empty mass: 54,978 lb (24,938 kg)
- Gross mass: 449,840 lb (204,040 kg)
- Powered by: 4 Rocketdyne J-2
- Maximum thrust: 800,000 lbf (3,600 kN)
- Specific impulse: 300 sec (sea level)
- Burn time: 200 seconds
- Propellant: LH_{2} / LOX

Third stage – S-IVB
- Height: 61.6 ft (18.8 m)
- Diameter: 21.7 ft (6.6 m)
- Empty mass: 29,700 lb (13,500 kg)
- Gross mass: 271,000 lb (123,000 kg)
- Powered by: 1 Rocketdyne J-2
- Maximum thrust: 225,000 lbf (1,000 kN)
- Specific impulse: 421 seconds (4.13 km/s)
- Burn time: 165 + 335 seconds (2 burns)
- Propellant: LH_{2} / LOX

The Saturn C-4 was the fourth rocket in the Saturn C series studied from 1959 to 1962. The C-4 design was proposed in 1960 for a three-stage launch vehicle that could launch 99,000 kg (218,000 lb) to low Earth orbit and send 32,000 kg (70,000 lb) to the Moon via trans-lunar injection. It met the initial requirements for a lunar orbit rendezvous and lunar landing mission.

It would have consisted of three stages; an S-IB-4 first stage, a S-II-4 second stage and a S-IVB third stage. The first and second stages were essentially four-engine variants of the stages that would be used on the Saturn V, while the IVB stage was actually used on both the Saturn V and the Saturn IB.

It would have been capable of sending the 30,000 kg (67,000 lb) Apollo Command/Service Module into lunar orbit, but it would not have been able to carry the 15,000 kg (32,000 lb) Apollo Lunar Module as well. Although NASA eventually used the lunar orbit rendezvous method to go to the Moon, it decided to use the larger Saturn V which would provide a reserve payload capacity.

A December 1961 version called Saturn C-4B would have consisted of a IC C-4B first stage, a S-II C-5A second stage and a S-IVB C-5A third stage. It would have been capable of sending a 31,000 kg (68,000 lb) payload to a translunar trajectory.

== See also ==
- Saturn C-3
- List of space launch system designs
