= Juno V =

Proposed 1950s rocket

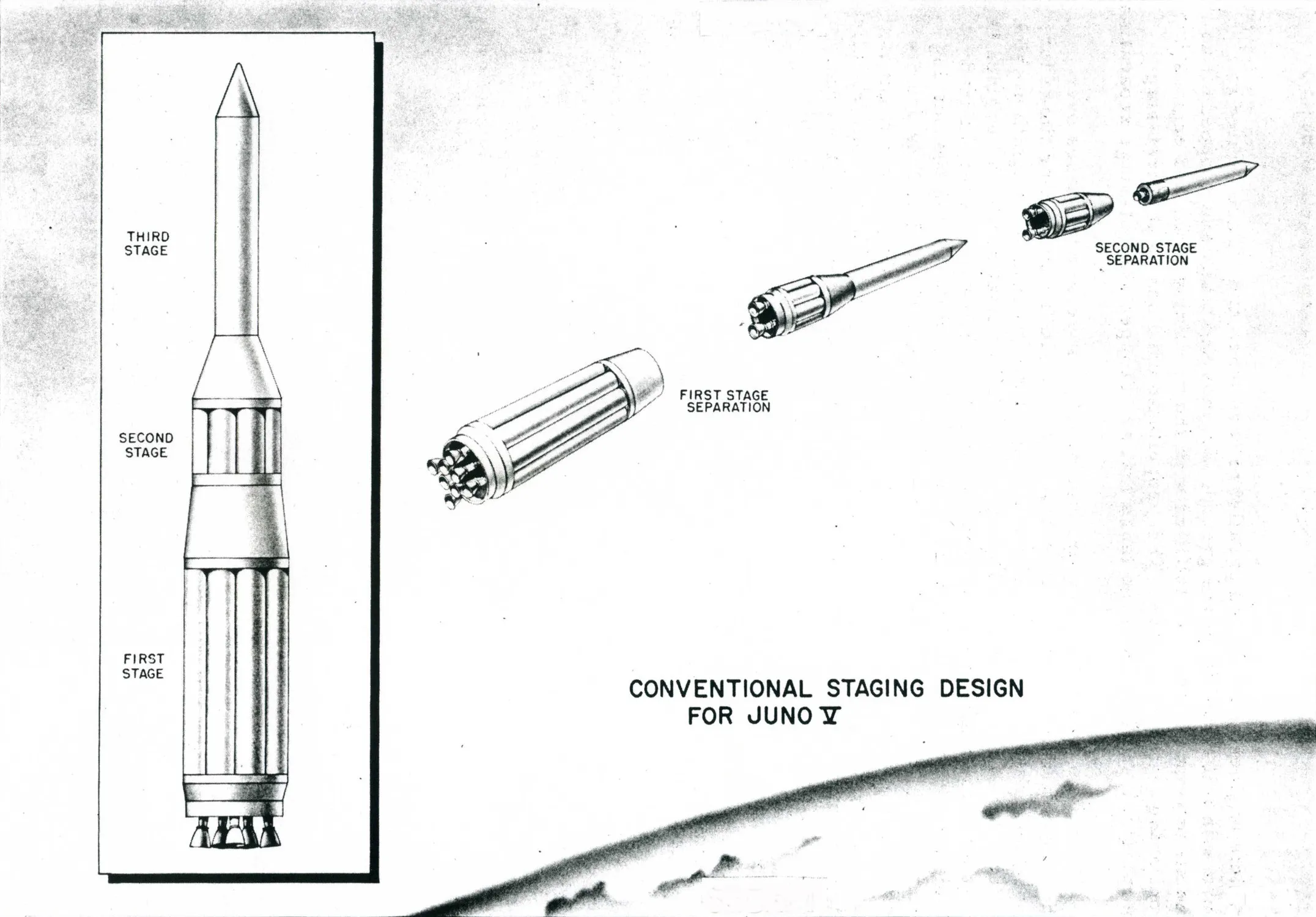
General three-stage Juno V concept

The Juno V series of rockets were a design that was proposed in the late 1950s but cancelled. The rockets were multi-stage and, although they failed to reach production, their sections were used in other designs. The Juno V was an eight-engine cluster concept, requiring second and third stages to make a complete booster. Depending on the stages added, the rocket would either be a Juno V-A or a Juno V-B.

== Juno V-A ==
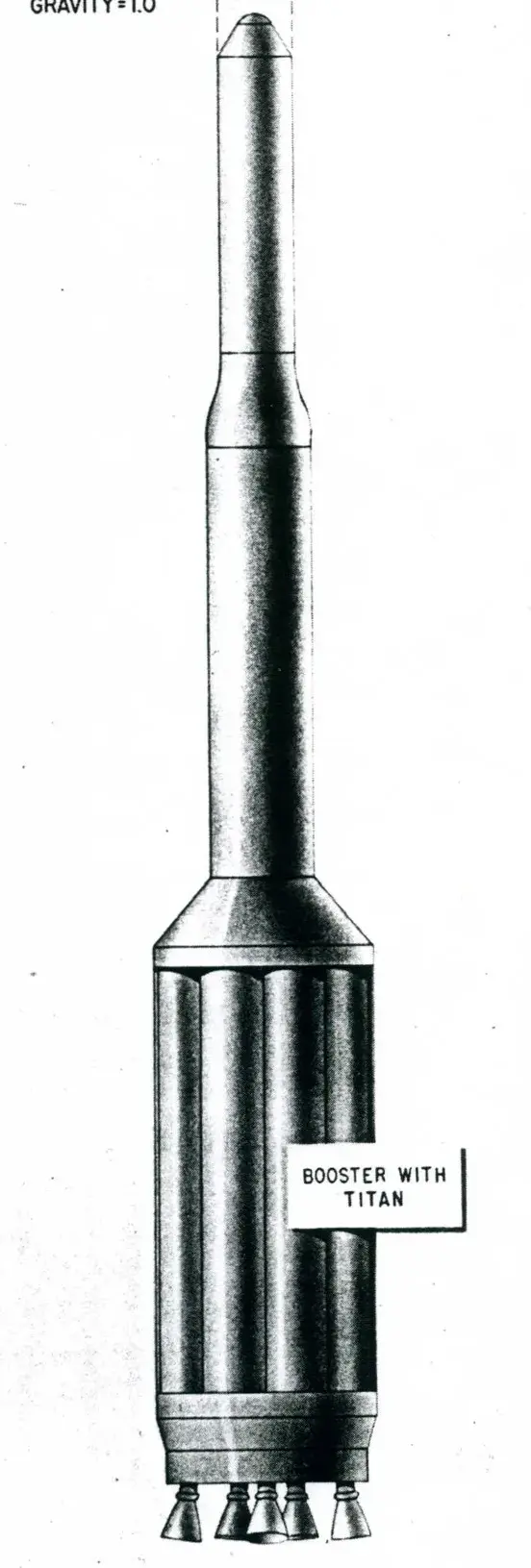
Juno V-A: Saturn I first stage and Titan I as second and third stages

Juno V-A was studied in 1958, as a new name for the Super-Jupiter rocket. Super-Jupiter planned on using four Rocketdyne E-1 engines in its second stage, but this project was cancelled so V-A would use the S-I first stage to propel it into space and a whole Titan I ICBM to continue the journey. Juno V-A was never developed, but all its stages were used on different launch vehicles, now retired as of today.

== Juno V-B ==
Juno V-B, studied in the same year as Juno V-A, was proposed for lunar and interplanetary missions into space. It was just like the Juno V-A, except the third stage, originally the second stage of a Titan I booster, would be replaced with a Centaur C high-energy third stage. A year after Juno V-B's study, the booster received a new name: the Saturn A-1, which, like the Juno series of rockets was never built in its original planned form, but all its stages were used on different launch vehicles.

== See also ==
- S-I
- Saturn I
- Juno II
- Titan I
- Centaur
