= Rocketdyne S-3D =

American liquid rocket engine

S-3D
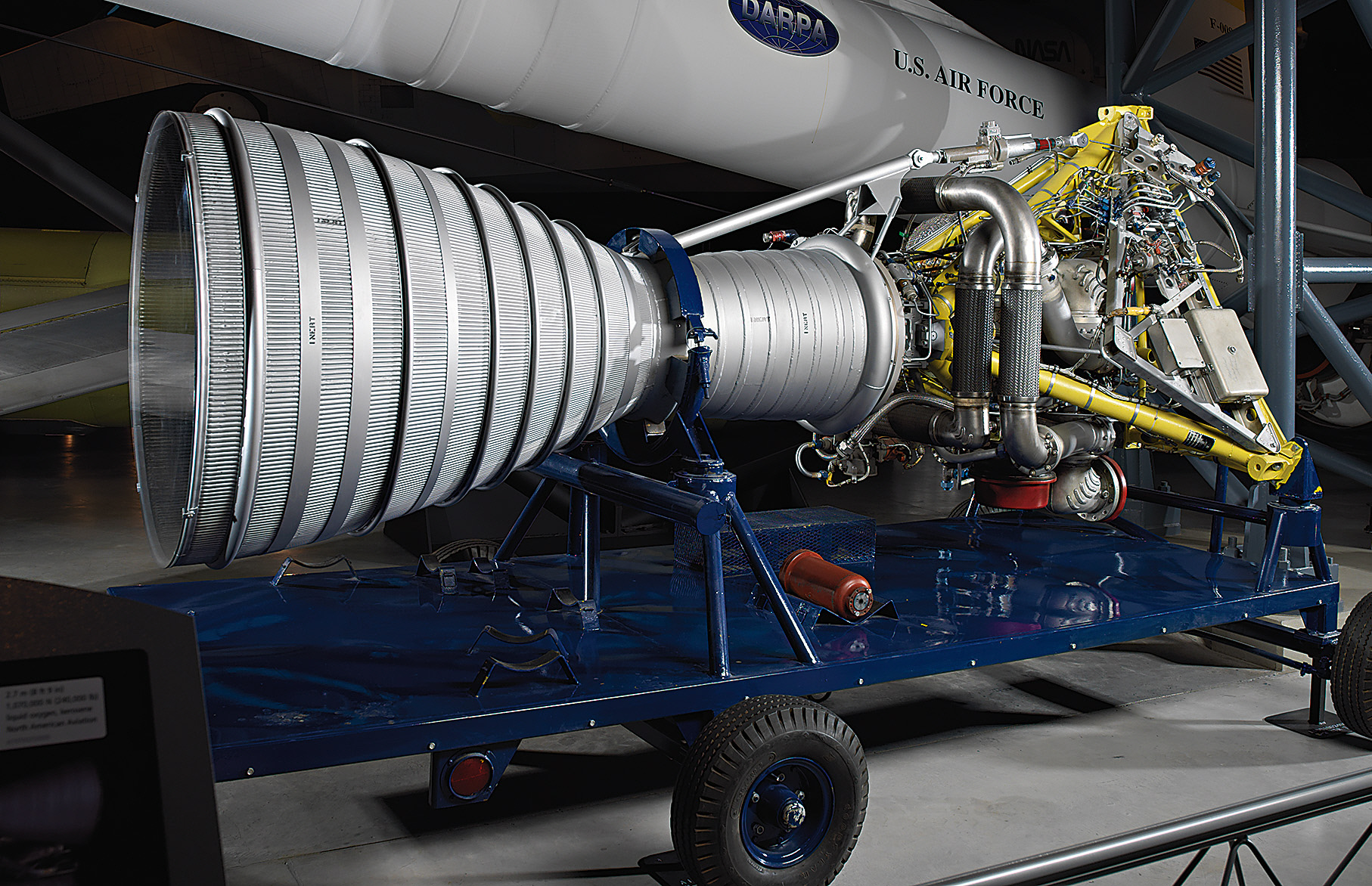
- S-3D engine at the National Air and Space Museum
- Country of origin: United States
- Manufacturer: Rocketdyne
- Application: Booster
- Successor: H-1
- Status: Retired

Liquid-fuel engine
- Propellant: LOX / RP-1
- Cycle: Gas Generator

Configuration
- Chamber: 1

Performance
- Thrust, sea-level: 134908 lbf (600.1 kN)
- Specific impulse, sea-level: 247 seconds (2.42 km/s)

Used in
- PGM-19 Jupiter, PGM-17 Thor, Juno II, Saturn A-2

The Rocketdyne S-3D (Air Force designation LR79) was an American liquid rocket engine produced by Rocketdyne (a division of North American Aviation) between 1956 and 1961. It was a gas generator, pump-fed engine, using a liquid oxygen (LOX) and RP-1 (kerosene) propellant combination, capable of producing 134,908 pounds of thrust (600.1 kN) at sea level.

The S-3 was based on the Redstone engine, and is part of the LR79 family, used on the PGM-19 Jupiter and PGM-17 Thor missiles, and on the Juno II rocket. Other members of the LR79 engine family include: XLR71-NA-1, B-2C, XLR83-NA-1, LR79-7, S-3D, XLR89-1, MB-3-1, X-1, LR83-NA-1, H-1, LR89-5, XLR89-5, S-3, LR89-7, MB-3-J, MB-3, MB-3-3, RZ.2, H-1c, H-1b, RS-27, RS-27A R, RS-56-OBA and RS-27C.

A second stage with four S-3 engines was considered for the Saturn A-2 study.

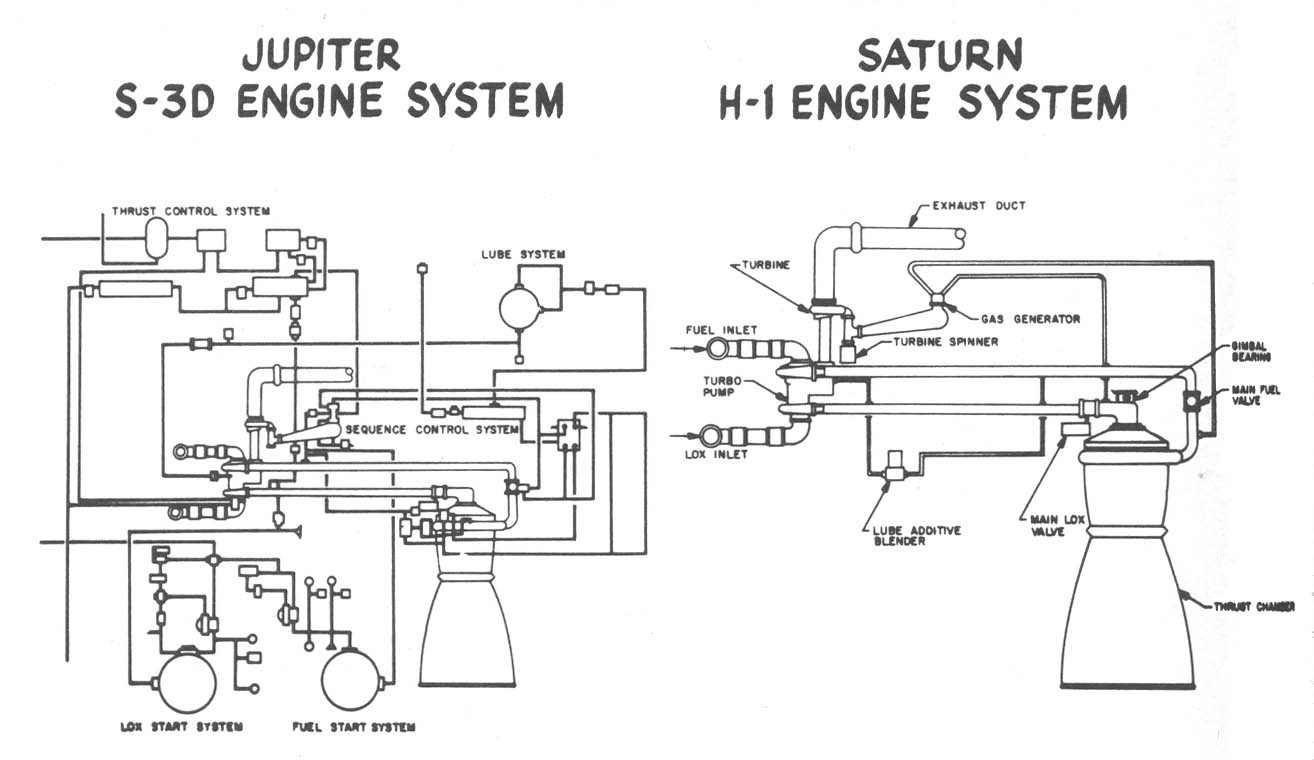
Simplification of the S-3D engine, via the unillustrated X-1, to the Saturn I's H-1

Its design was used later as the basis for the H-1 rocket engine of the Saturn I, and the Rolls-Royce RZ.2 of the Blue Streak.

== Specifications ==
Rocketdyne S-3D:

- First flight: 1957
- Vehicles: PGM-19 Jupiter
- Thrust: 600.1 kN (134908 lbf).
- Specific impulse: 282 s.
- Burn time: 247 s.

Rocketdyne S-3:

- First flight: 1958
- Vehicles: Juno II, Saturn A-2
- Thrust: 667.2 kN (149993 lbf).
- Specific impulse: 282 s.
- Burn time: 182 s.
- Diameter: 2.67 m (8.75 ft).
- Dry mass: 725 kg (1,598 lb)
