= Advanced Launch System =

Joint US Air Force–NASA rocket development study

The Advanced Launch System (ALS) is a joint United States Air Force (USAF) and National Aeronautics and Space Administration (NASA) study which operated from 1987 to 1990. Its aim was to develop a flexible, modular, heavy-lift, high rate space launch vehicle that could deliver payloads to Earth orbit at a tenth the cost of existing boosters.

== Background ==
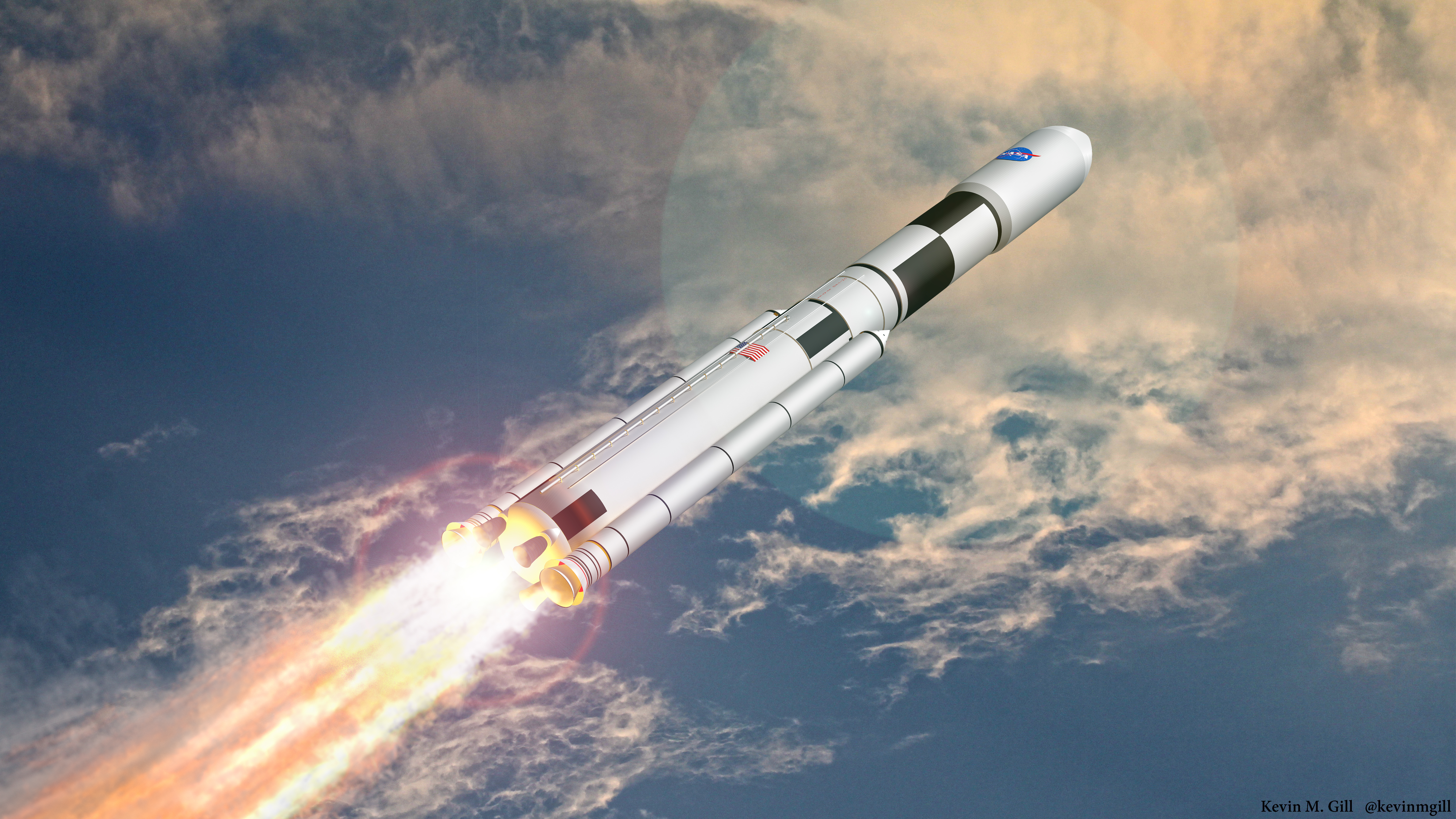
An artist's rendering of the 2010s Space Launch System, which contains some design heritage from the ALS

The ALS was a joint USAF and NASA study from 1987 to 1990. It was an endeavour of the years following the Space Shuttle Challenger disaster. Colonel John R. Wormington (retired Brigadier General USAF) was the Program Director of the Joint Department of Defense and NASA Advanced Launch System Program Office. Lieutenant Colonel Michael C. Mushala (retired Major General USAF) was assigned as Wormington's deputy. The program operated from the Los Angeles Air Force Base. In October 1989, Mushala was promoted to Colonel. In February 1990, Wormington was reassigned to command the 45th Space Wing at Patrick Air Force Base in Florida. Mushala became the program director and remained so until the project was disbanded in July 1990.

Although the project had a projected research and development cost of $15 billion, its early cancellation led to a final cost just under $3 billion.

The ALS program office differed from others in that it was the only one within the Air Force Space Command. The office was furnished with Apple Mac OS personal computers instead of the Command's usual Microsoft Windows systems. This was in part because NASA had already been using Apple computers. The program office pioneered what later became the Microsoft Project.

== Aims ==
The ALS program was charged with deploying the space based elements of the Strategic Defense Initiative (SDI) program. Secondly, the ALS program was to find a way to transport many thousands of tons of equipment for the SDI into low Earth orbit at a cost less than $1,000 per kilogram. The usual cost was about $10,000 per kg.

The program had three main contractors, each with an $800 million multi-year contract. They were Boeing Aerospace, Martin-Marietta, and General Dynamics. The ALS program budget was just under $2.5 billion.

== Progress ==
In 1989, the Bush administration, via the Defense Acquisition Board, was asked to ratify an existing plan to have the ALS program at an advanced state of development in 1990; ready for a first flight in 1998; and fully operational in 2000. Then, from 2000 to 2005, the ALS program would develop a modular family of launch vehicles, with a payload capacity to low Earth orbit ranging from 5,000 kilograms to 200,000 kilograms.

However, by late 1989, it was apparent that the ALS program was no longer required. The initial phase of the SDI would employ existing Titan IV and Atlas II rockets. The launch requirements for subsequent phases of the SDI deployment were too vague to allow the immediate ongoing direction of the ALS program and its associated costs.

At the end of 1990, the ALS program, was changed to a propulsion development project with an annual budget of $150 million.

== See also ==
- Advanced Transportation System Studies (1992–1994)
- National Launch System (1991–1993)
- National AeroSpace Plane (ca. 1990 - 1993)
- Advisory Committee on the Future of the U.S. Space Program (Augustine Committee, 1990)
- Space Exploration Initiative (1989)
- Advanced Launch System (1987–1990)
- Jarvis (rocket)
- List of space launch system designs
