= Project Horizon =

1959 American moonbase feasibility study

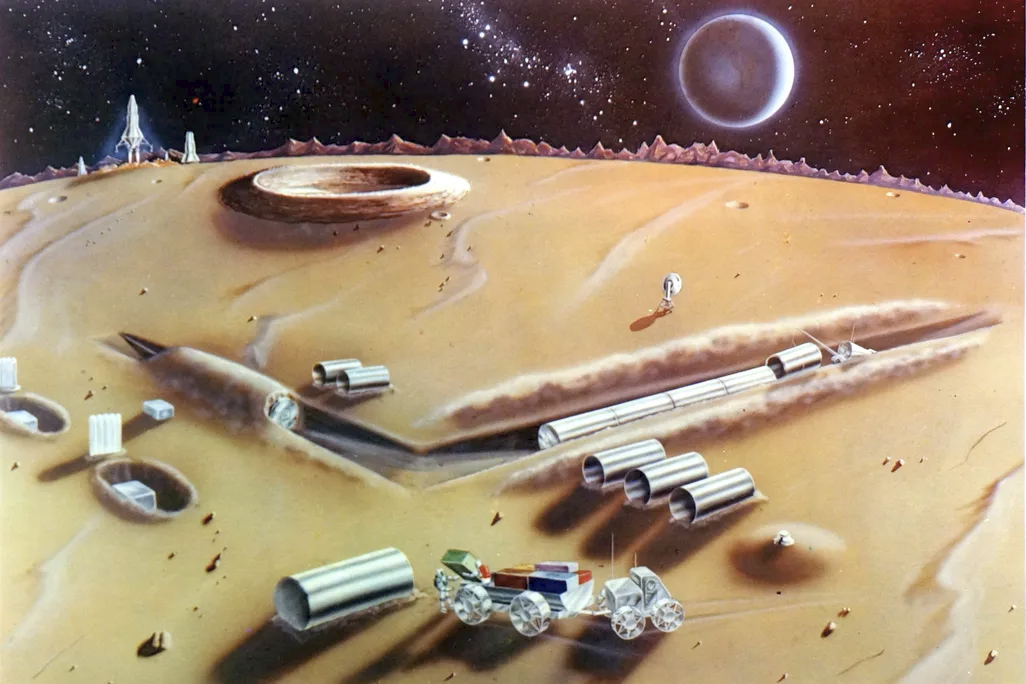
Project Horizon Lunar Outpost as it would appear by late 1965

Project Horizon was a 1959 study to determine the feasibility of constructing a scientific / military base on the Moon, at a time when the U.S. Department of the Army, Department of the Navy, and Department of the Air Force had total responsibility for U.S. space program plans. On June 8, 1959, a group at the Army Ballistic Missile Agency (ABMA) produced for the Army a report titled Project Horizon, A U.S. Army Study for the Establishment of a Lunar Military Outpost. The project proposal states the requirements as:

The lunar outpost is required to develop and protect potential United States interests on the moon; to develop techniques in moon-based surveillance of the earth and space, in communications relay, and in operations on the surface of the moon; to serve as a base for exploration of the moon, for further exploration into space and for military operations on the moon if required; and to support scientific investigations on the moon.

The permanent outpost was predicted to be required for national security "as soon as possible", and to cost $6 billion. The projected operational date with twelve soldiers was December 1966.

Horizon never progressed past the feasibility stage, being rejected by President Dwight Eisenhower when primary responsibility for America's space program was transferred to the civilian agency NASA.

== Space transportation system ==
Horizon was estimated to require 147 early Saturn A-1 rocket launches to loft spacecraft components for assembly in low Earth orbit at a spent-tank space station. A lunar landing-and-return vehicle launched on a Saturn A-2 would have shuttled up to 16 astronauts at a time to the base and back. This was in lieu of a 12 million-pound thrust superbooster required for a direct-ascent lunar flight, which could not possibly be developed in time for the 1966 deployment target. Wernher von Braun, head of ABMA, appointed Heinz-Hermann Koelle to head the Saturn development project team at Redstone Arsenal.

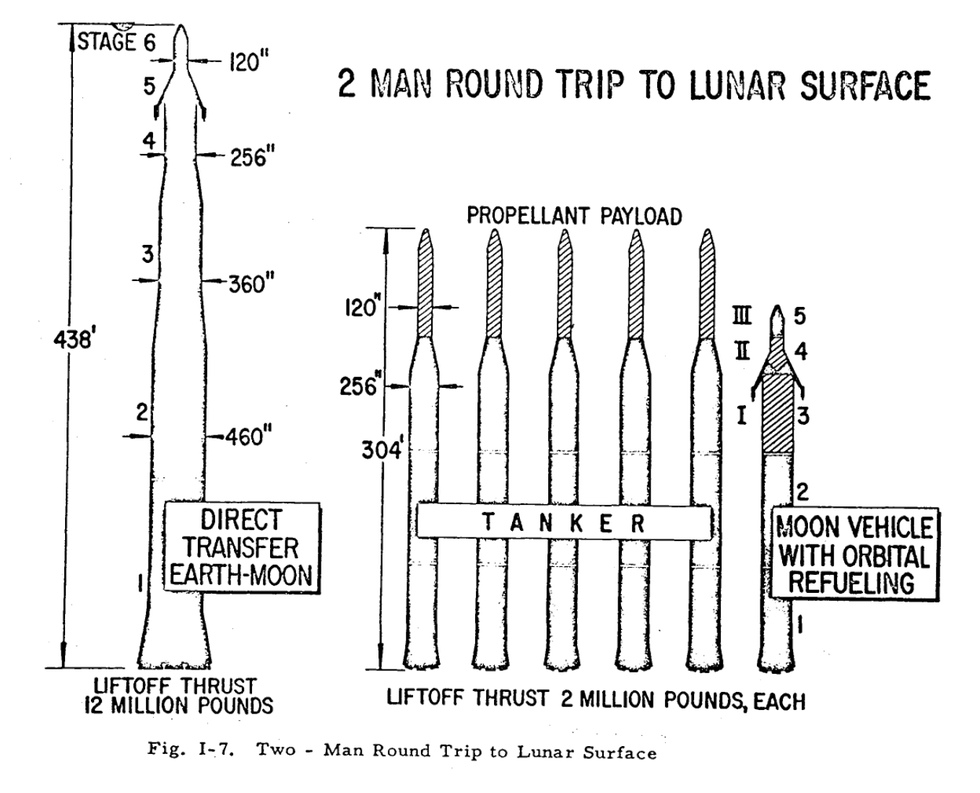
Required launches for a two-man round trip to the lunar surface

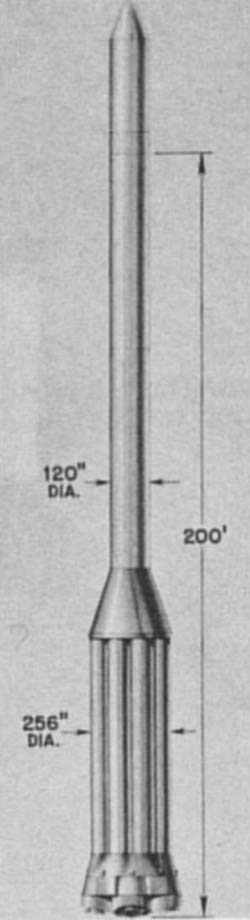
Saturn A-1 / Saturn I configuration for Project Horizon

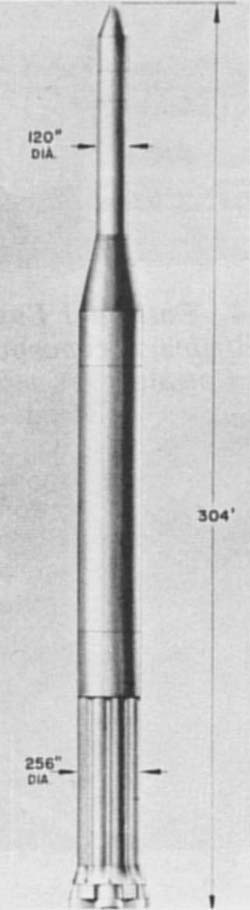
Saturn A-2 / Saturn II configuration for Project Horizon

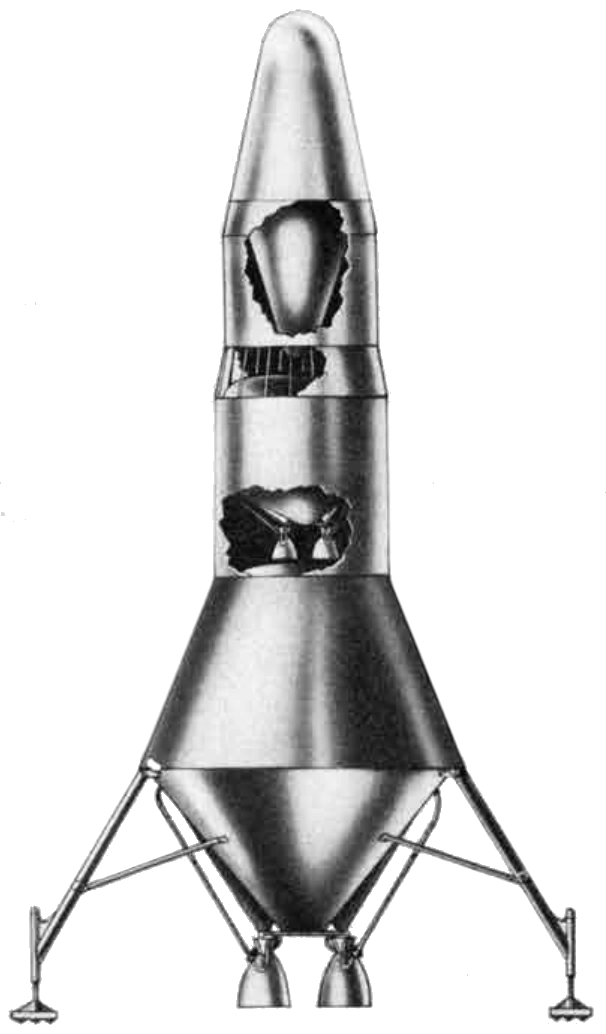
Project Horizon Lunar Landing-and-Return Vehicle.

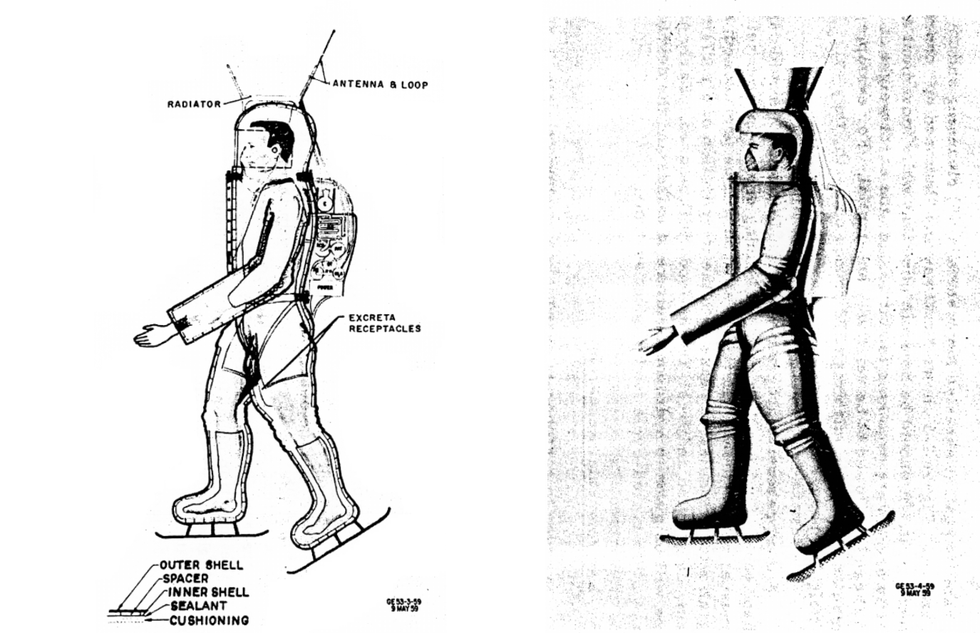
Lunar Space Suit

=== Proposed Timeline ===
- 1964: 40 Saturn launches.
- January 1965: Cargo delivery to the Moon would begin.
- April 1965: The first crewed landing by two soldiers. The build-up and construction phase would continue without interruption until the outpost was ready.
- November 1966: Outpost staffed by a task force of 12 soldiers. This program would have required a total of 61 Saturn A-1 and 88 Saturn A-2 launches up to November 1966. During this period the rockets would transport some 220 tonnes of useful cargo to the Moon.
- December 1966 through 1967: First operational year of the lunar outpost, with a total of 64 launches scheduled. These would result in an additional 120 tons of useful cargo.

== Moon Base ==
=== Location ===
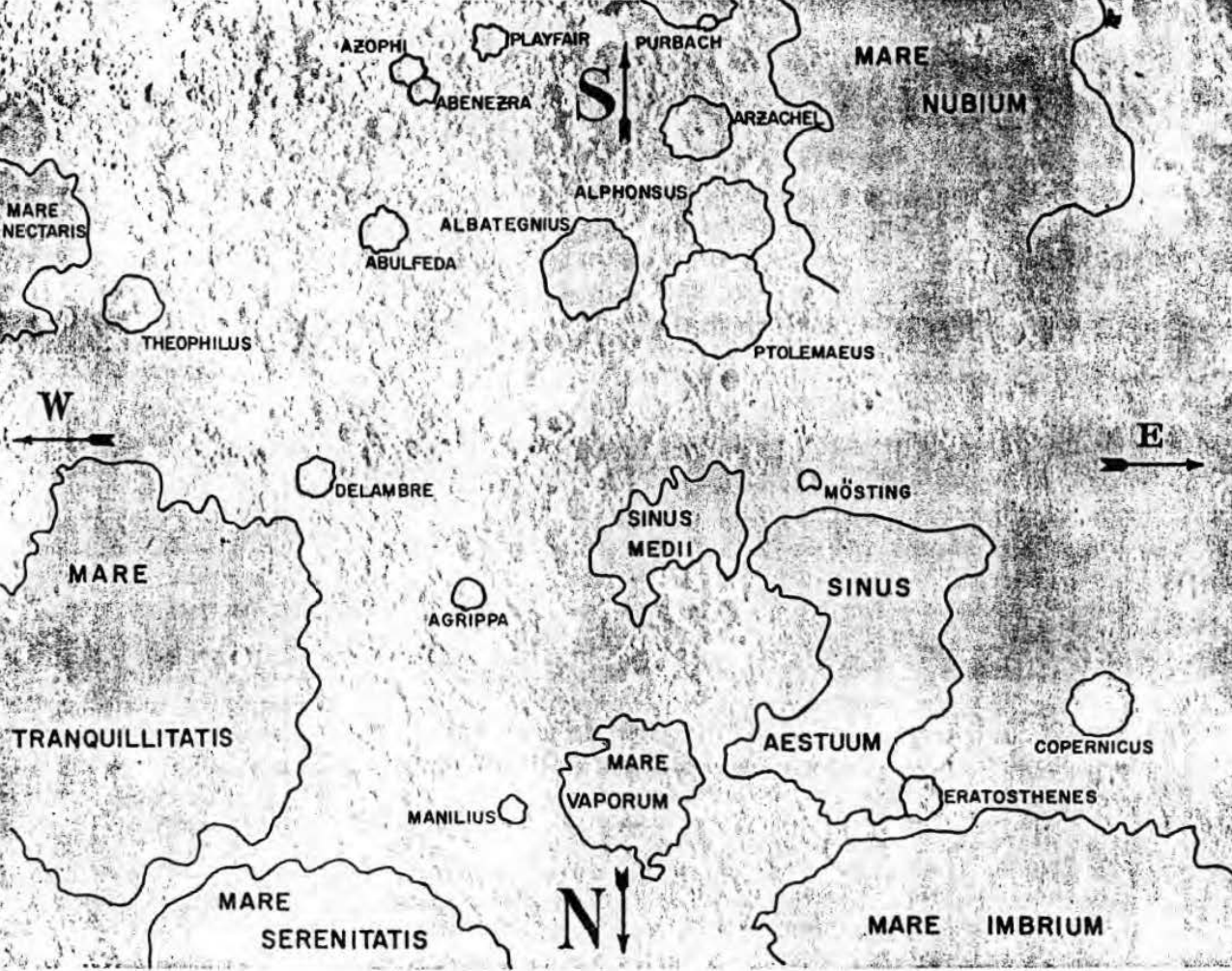
Lunar Area of Interest with Most Promising Outpost Locations

Rocket-vehicle energy requirements would have limited the location of the base to an area of 20 deg latitude/longitude on the Moon, from ~20° N, ~20° W to ~20° S, ~20° E. Within this area, the Project selected three particular sites:

- northern part of Sinus Aestuum, near the Eratosthenes crater
- southern part of Sinus Aestuum near Sinus Medii
- southwest coast of Mare Imbrium, just north of the Montes Apenninus mountains

=== Defenses ===
The base would be defended against Soviet overland attack by manually fired weapons:

- Unguided Davy Crockett rockets with low-yield nuclear warheads
- Conventional Claymore mines modified to puncture pressure suits

=== Layout ===
The basic building block for the outpost would be cylindrical metal tanks, 10 feet (3.0 m) in diameter and 20 feet (6.1 m) in length.

Two nuclear reactors would be located in pits for shielding, and would provide power for operation of the preliminary quarters and for the equipment used in the construction of the permanent facility. Empty cargo and propellant containers would be assembled and used for storage of bulk supplies, weapons, and life essentials.

Two types of surface vehicles would be used, one for lifting, digging, and scraping, another for more extended distance trips needed for hauling, reconnaissance and rescue.

A lightweight parabolic antenna erected near the main quarters would provide communications with Earth. At the conclusion of the construction phase the original construction camp quarters would be converted to bio-science and physics-science laboratories.

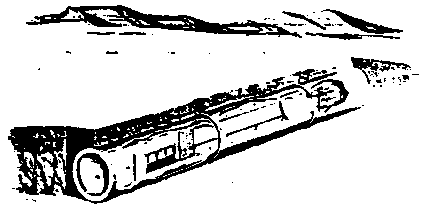
Cross Section of Typical Lunar Outpost Compartment

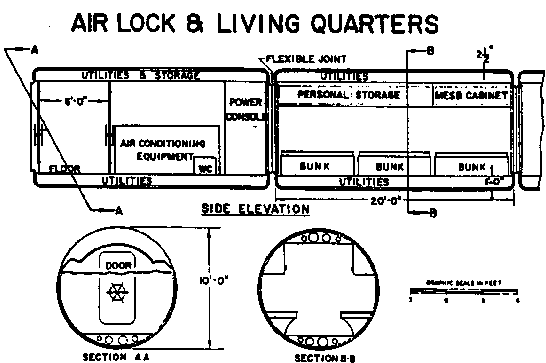
Horizon Camp - Overall View of Initial Lunar Construction Camp

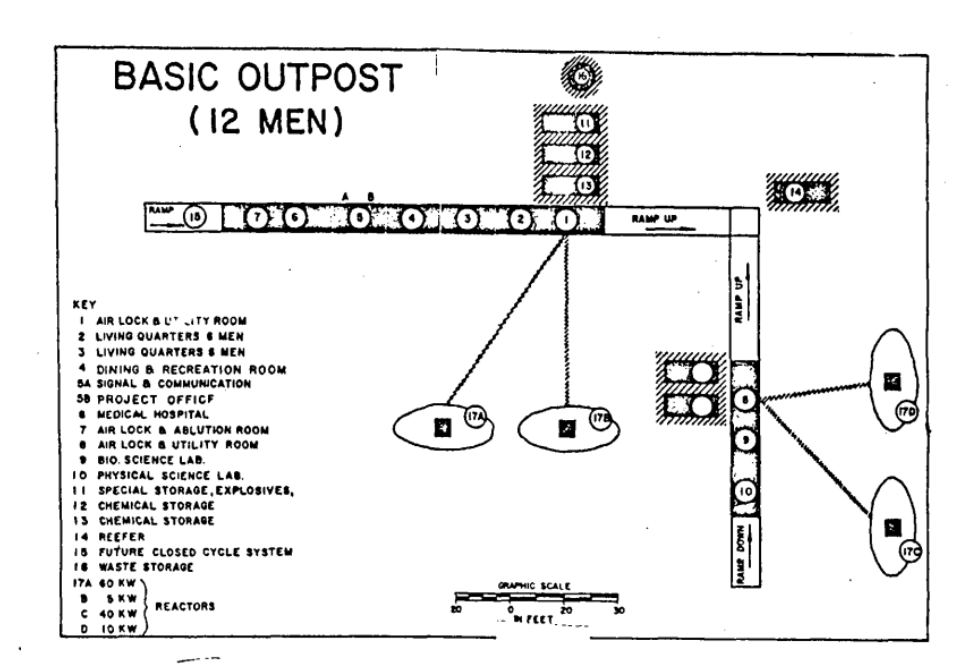
Horizon First Camp - Layout of a Basic 12-Man Outpost

== See also ==
- Saturn (rocket family)
- Lunex Project
- Colonization of the Moon
- Project A119
- Zvezda (moonbase)
