= Rocketdyne H-1 =

American kerolox rocket engine

H-1
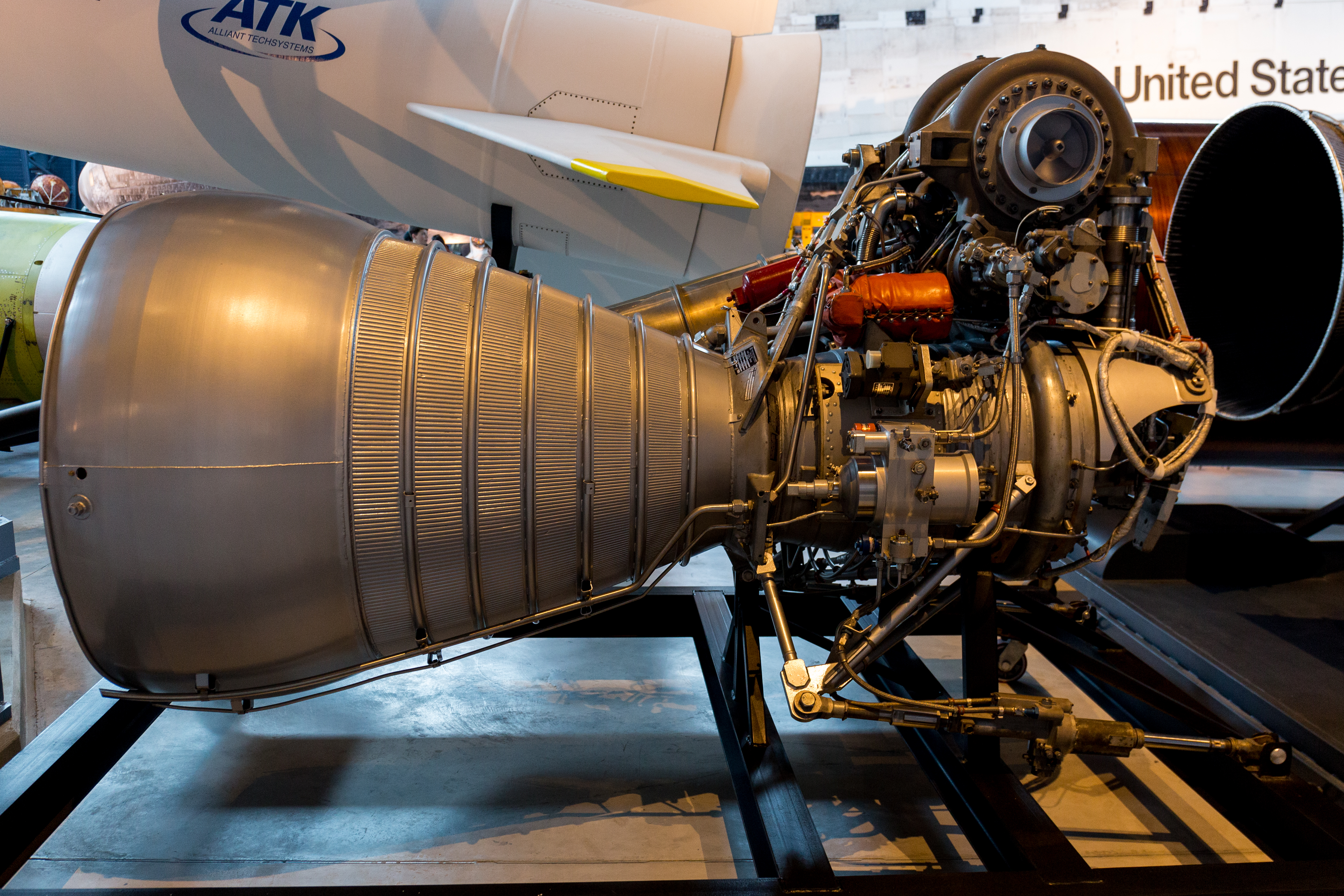
- H-1 engine, from the Udvar-Hazy Center.
- Country of origin: United States
- First flight: 27 October 1961
- Last flight: 15 July 1975
- Designer: Rocketdyne
- Manufacturer: Rocketdyne
- Application: First stage
- Successor: RS-27
- Status: Retired

Liquid-fuel engine
- Propellant: LOX / RP-1
- Cycle: Gas-generator

Configuration
- Chamber: 1

Performance
- Thrust, sea-level: 900 kN (200,000 lb_{f})
- Thrust-to-weight ratio: 102.47
- Chamber pressure: 700 psi (4,800 kPa)
- Specific impulse, vacuum: 289 s (2.83 km/s)
- Specific impulse, sea-level: 255 s (2.50 km/s)
- Burn time: 155 seconds

Dimensions
- Length: 2.7 m (8.8 ft)
- Diameter: 1.5 m (4.9 ft)
- Dry mass: 1,000 kg (2,200 lb)

Used in
- Saturn I, Saturn 1B

The Rocketdyne H-1 was a 205,000 lbf (910 kN) thrust liquid-propellant rocket engine burning LOX and RP-1. The H-1 was developed for use in the S-I and S-IB first stages of the Saturn I and Saturn IB rockets, respectively, where it was used in clusters of eight engines. After the Apollo program, surplus H-1 engines were rebranded and reworked as the Rocketdyne RS-27 engine with first usage on the Delta 2000 series in 1974. RS-27 engines continued to be used up until 1992 when the first version of the Delta II, Delta 6000, was retired. The RS-27A variant, boasting slightly upgraded performance, was also used on the later Delta II and Delta III rockets, with the former flying until 2018.

== History ==
=== Early engines ===
The H-1 is one of a series of engines developed from the wartime V-2 ballistic missile. During the war, North American Aviation (NAA) was given several 59,600 lbf (264.9 kN) V-2 engines to examine and convert from metric to SAE measurements. They formed their "Propulsion Division" to handle this work, later becoming Rocketdyne.

NAA had also been given a wealth of technical documentation on the engine. Engineers studying them came across plans to improve the V-2 engine using a new "waterfall" fuel injector. The Germans were unable to get the design to work and it never went into service. NAA engineers decided to attack this problem and quickly came up with solutions. This allowed them to raise the thrust of the design to 75,000 lbf (330 kN), and then 78,000 lbf (350 kN) for the Redstone missile.

NAA had also been working on the SM-64 Navaho cruise missile project, which used the same engine as a booster to get the missile up to speed so its ramjet engines could light. The Air Force continually demanded higher performance from the Navaho, which forced NAA to build larger missiles, and larger boosters to launch it. By the early 1950s, the basic engine design had been enlarged to produce 120,000 lbf (530 kN).

All of these designs, like the V-2 that spawned them, burned ethanol, but other fuels had also been experimented with, including kerosene, diesel oil, paint thinner, JP-4, and JP-5 jet fuel. In January 1953 Rocketdyne started their "REAP" program to convert these engines to a specific and well-engineered kerosene fuel specifically for rocket engines, which became RP-1, officially specified in Military Specification MIL-R-25576 in 1954.

In 1955, the Air Force selected a JP-4 burning version of the engine to power their Atlas missile. The US Army requested a further boost to 150,000 lbf (670 kN) for their Jupiter missile, and the Air Force used the same version for their Thor, producing the Rocketdyne S-3D (or LR-79).

All of these engines were based on a similar design concept, featuring a "waterfall injector", where many small fuel injectors were used to spray burning fuel into the main combustion chamber. They also shared a complex system for starting the turbopumps, using a set of secondary fuel tanks and plumbing that fed the gas generator and main combustors while the pumps were still bringing the main fuel lines up to pressure. A complex series of electropneumatic valves operated the various fuel flows until the engine was fully started.

=== X-1 ===
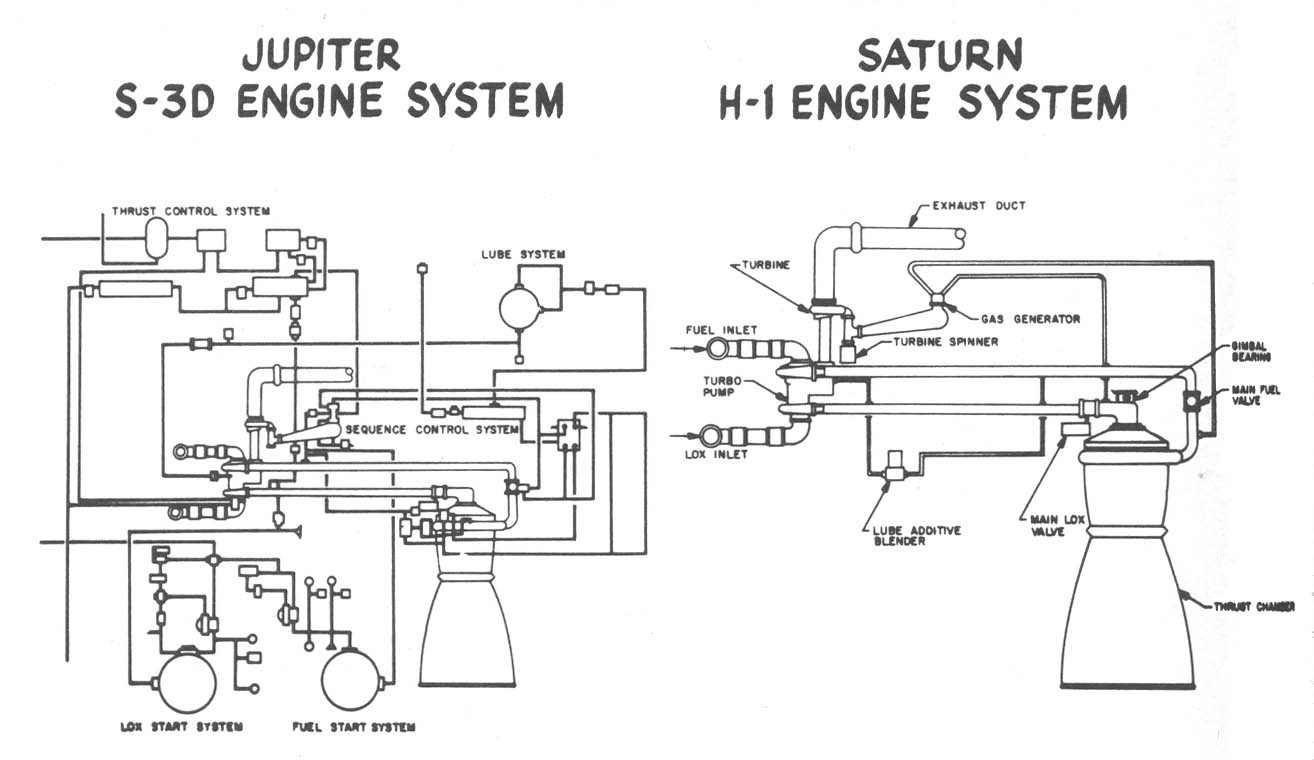
This chart shows the dramatic simplification of the S-3D engine, via the unillustrated X-1, to the Saturn I's H-1.

With the successful running of the S-3D for the Thor and Jupiter, the company turned their attention to a radically updated version, originally known as the S-3X, but later becoming the X-1. This engine replaced the complex valve system and all of its attended sensors and electronics with new valves that operated on the pressure of the fuel itself. This meant that the complex start-up procedure was entirely automated and driven off the fuel flow itself.

Additionally, the X-1 removed the entire start tank system and replaced it with a small solid fuel rocket engine that fed its exhaust through the gas generator to spin the turbopumps. This change dramatically simplified engine plumbing, at the cost of making the design a single-shot device. Earlier engines could, in theory, be restarted in flight, but with a single starter cartridge, the X-1 could be started once only.

Another change was to introduce an ignitor using a pyrophoric fuel in place of the solid fuel versions of earlier designs. The earlier engines required the ignitors to be inserted through holes in the engine into the combustion chamber, but the new system allowed the fuel to be sprayed into the main injector. The fuel, triethylaluminum, was delivered in a cube with diaphragms that burst when the fuel flow in the injector reached a set threshold.

Finally, the X-1 introduced a new lubrication system that added a small amount of additive to the RP-1 fuel as it flowed through the various components. This was fed under pressure into the various bearings in the turbopump system, both lubricating it and carrying away heat.

=== Saturn and H-1 ===
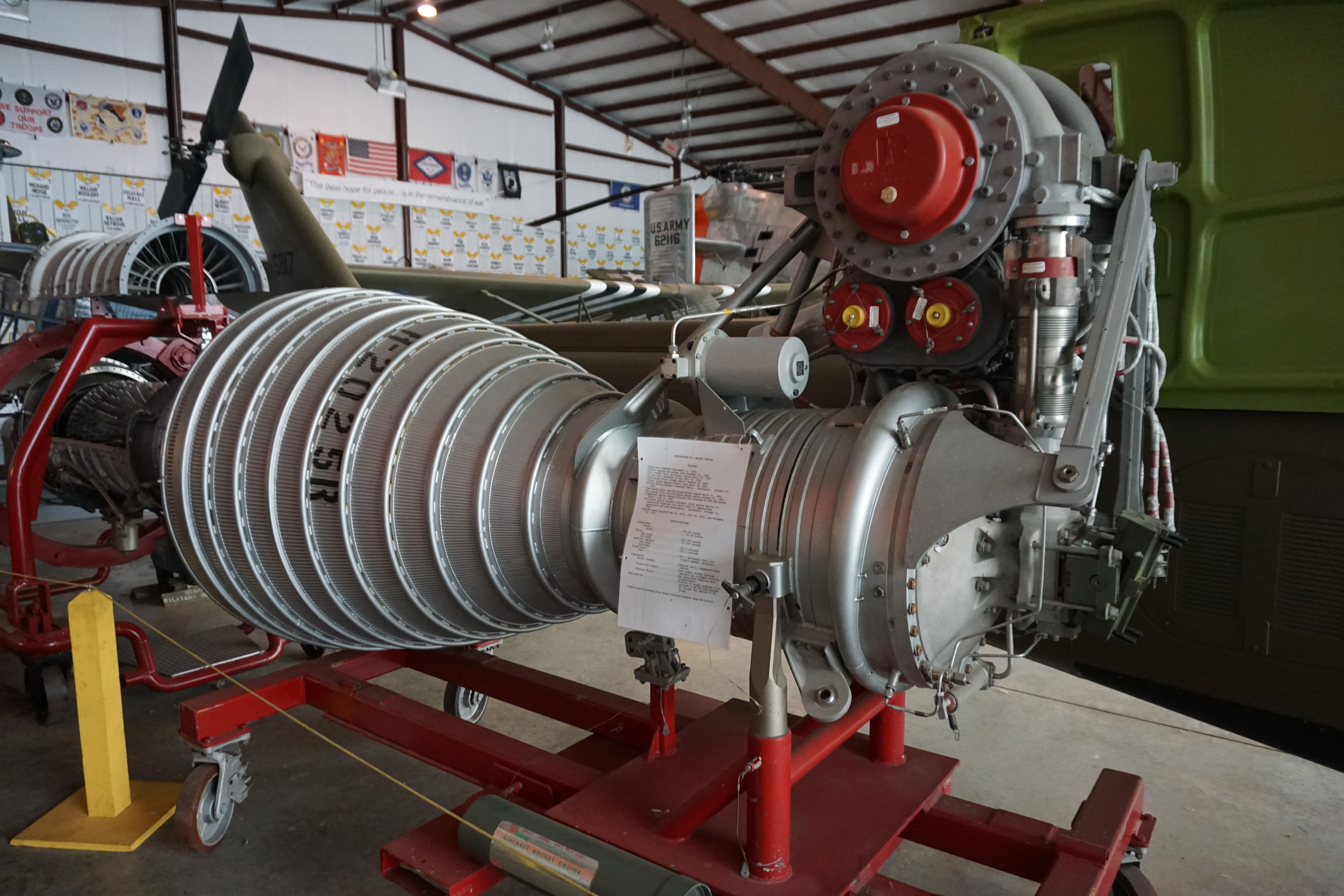
H-1 on display at the Arkansas Air & Military Museum in Fayetteville, Arkansas

Saturn started as a paper project to meet a new US Department of Defense requirement for a heavy-lift vehicle able to lift 10,000 to 40,000 pounds into low Earth orbit (LEO), or accelerating 6,000 to 12,000 lb to escape velocity. Existing launchers might be extended to reach 10,000 lb to LEO, below the requirements. A new and larger design was needed, and in April 1957, Wernher von Braun handed the preliminary design task to Heinz-Hermann Koelle.

Koelle's solution to reducing the development time was to use a cluster of fuel tanks from Redstone and Jupiter missiles, sit them on top of a single thrust plate, and then attach the required engines to the bottom of the plate. Calculations demonstrated that a total thrust of about 1 million pounds would be needed, greatly limiting their engine selection. Looking for suitable designs, Koelle learned of the E-1 from Rocketdyne's George Sutton. Rocketdyne was developing this 400,000 lbf (1,800 kN) engine for the Titan missile, and it was the largest engine nearing introduction within the time frame that ARPA gave Wernher von Braun to develop what was then known as the "Juno V". The E-1 had originally been developed as a backup engine for the Titan missile, designed specifically to be as simple to develop as possible, in case the Aerojet General LR-87 did not pan out.

The launch of Sputnik that October led to rapid changes in the US rocketry establishment. In order to demonstrate peaceful intent, the US decided to spin out its various non-military rocketry programs to a new agency, which would evolve as NASA. As the Army had lost interest in large rockets, they agreed to turn over von Braun's ABMA team to NASA, becoming the Marshall Space Flight Center. The handover would take place in 1960.

Shortly after these plans were made, in July 1958 ARPA visited ABMA and told von Braun that they still had $10 million in their budget to spend before the handover, and asked if there was any way to effectively use the money. Von Braun called in Koelle and showed them a model of the Juno V, but the ARPA visitors noted that the E-1 engine wouldn't be ready by 1960. Brainstorming, they decided that the best approach was to make a minor upgrade to Rocketdyne's existing S-3D engines to boost them from 175,000 lbf (780 kN) to 200,000 lbf (890 kN), and use eight of these engines instead of four E-1s.

When Koelle returned to Rocketdyne looking for an upgraded version of the S-3D, they instead presented the X-1 and suggested it be used in place of a further upgrade to the S-3. Although experimental, the X-1 was already in the right thrust range and ready for full development. A contract for development was tendered on 15 August 1958, and by early 1959 the name had changed from Juno to Saturn, referring to the succession as the planet after Jupiter, the Jupiter missile being the previous ABMA design.

== Description ==
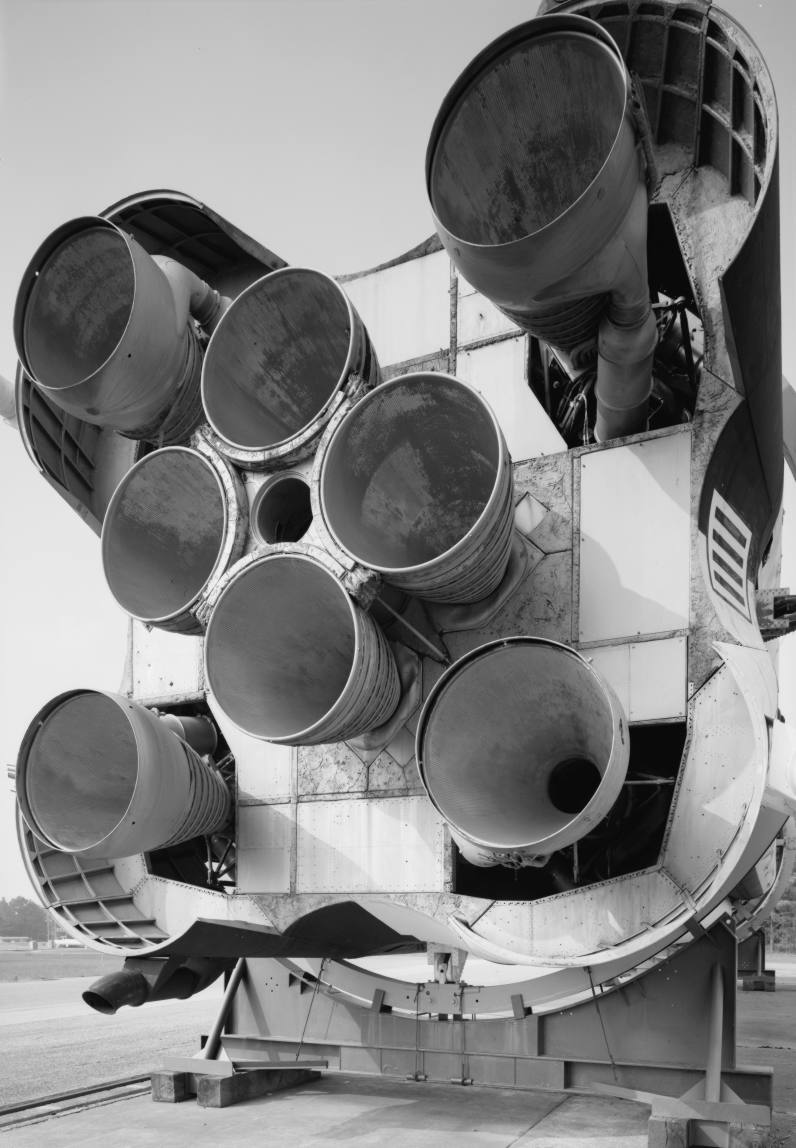
Eight H-1 engines in a Saturn I

Like all of Rocketdyne's early engines, the H-1 used a waterfall injector fed by turbopumps and regeneratively cooled the engine using the engine's fuel. The combustion chamber was made of 292 stainless steel tubes brazed in a furnace.

Unlike the J-2 engine used on the S-IVB stage, the H-1 was a single-start engine. It could be fired multiple times—and engines were usually subject to two or more static test firings before a mission to flight-qualify them—but it could not be restarted in flight, because some components required for the startup sequence were non-reusable. In particular, the turbopumps were initially driven by a Solid Propellant Gas Generator (SPGG), which was essentially a small solid rocket and had to be replaced after each firing.

To start the engine a 500V AC voltage was applied to the SPGG, which ignited the solid propellant. This produced hot gas which was allowed to build up until reaching a pressure of 600–700 psi, after which a bursting diaphragm released it into the turbine which drove the fuel turbopumps. This began the process of pumping fuel and oxidizer into the gas generator and the engine, and the hot gases from the SPGG provided the initial energy required to ignite the fuel/oxidizer mix. This started the turbopumps spinning. Once RP-1 and LOX started burning in the gas generator, the exhaust powered the turbopumps until engine shutdown.

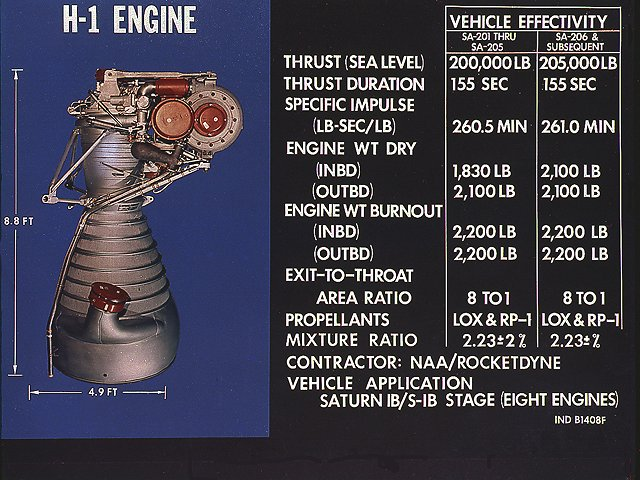
(See the original diagram with specifications.)

== Specifications ==
- Contractor: NAA/Rocketdyne
- Vehicle application: Saturn I / S-I 1st stage – 8 engines
- Vehicle application: Saturn IB / S-IB 1st stage – 8 engines

	Vehicle effectivity	
	SA-201 through SA-205	SA-206 and subsequent
Thrust (sea level)	200,000 lbf (890 kN)	205,000 lbf (910 kN)
Thrust duration	155 s	155 s
Specific impulse	289 seconds (2.83 km/s)	289 seconds (2.83 km/s)
Engine weight dry (inboard)	1,830 pounds (830 kg)	2,100 pounds (950 kg)
Engine weight dry (outboard)	2,100 pounds (950 kg)	2,100 pounds (950 kg)
Engine weight burnout	2,200 pounds (1,000 kg)	2,200 pounds (1,000 kg)
Exit-to-throat area ratio	8:1	8:1
Propellants	LOX & RP-1	LOX & RP-1
Mixture ratio	2.23±2%	2.23±2%
Fuel flow rate	2092 USgal/min (132 L/s)	
Oxidizer flow rate	3330 USgal/min (210 L/s)	
Nominal chamber pressure	633 psi (4.36 MPa)	
