= S-I =

First stage of the Saturn I rocket

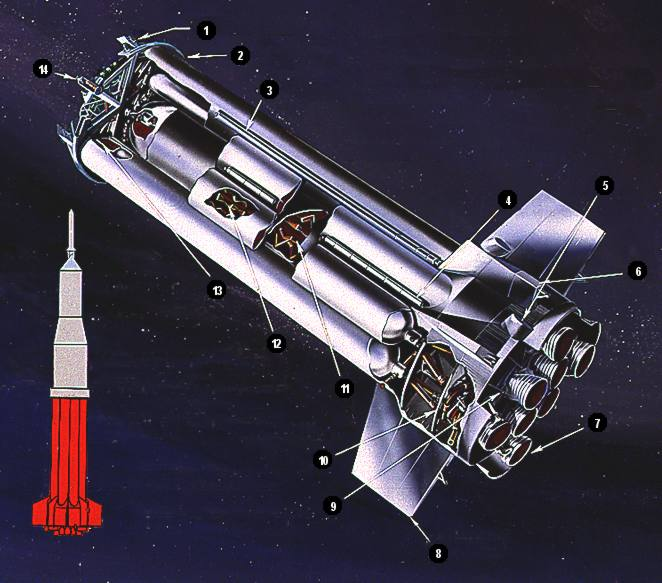
- S-I diagram
- Manufacturer: Chrysler
- Country of origin: United States
- Used on: Saturn I

General characteristics
- Height: 24.5 m (80.3 feet)
- Diameter: 6.5 m (21.4 feet)
- Gross mass: 432,681 kg (953,898 lb)
- Propellant mass: 397,414 kg (854,101 lb)
- Empty mass: 45,267 kg (99,796 lb)

Associated stages
- Family: Saturn

Launch history
- Status: Retired
- Total launches: 10
- Successes (stage only): 10
- First flight: October 27, 1961
- Last flight: July 30, 1965

S-I engine details
- Powered by: 8 H-1 engines
- Maximum thrust: (vac) 7,582.1 KN (1,704,524 lbf)
- Specific impulse: 289 sec
- Propellant: RP-1 / LOX

The S-I was the first stage of the Saturn I rocket used by NASA for the Apollo program.

== Design ==
The S-I stage was powered by eight H-1 rocket engines burning RP-1 fuel with liquid oxygen (LOX) as oxidizer. The design of the S-I was based on Jupiter and Redstone tanks to leverage existing chains. A central Jupiter tank was surrounded by a cluster of eight Redstone tanks. Four of these Redstone tanks contained LOX and four contained RP-1. The outer tanks were painted to alter thermal conditions inside the tanks and to provide a "roll pattern" used to estimate radial motion during flight. The engines were arranged in two clusters, a group of four fixed central engines and a group of four outer gimbaled engines. The gimbals allowed the stage to be controlled with thrust vectoring. On launches after SA-5, eight fins were added to enhance control during atmospheric flight.

== History ==
The S-I stage was developed by Chrysler and consisted of 9 tanks that were previously used on existing rockets. The central tank was a Jupiter tank that held liquid oxygen. This Jupiter tank was sounded by eight Redstone tanks, four for liquid oxygen and four for RP-1. The first four launches had no fins on the S-I, but the remaining six added them to improve stability during atmospheric flight. The initial launch of the Saturn I consisted of an active S-I, an inactive S-IV and inactive S-V stage. Tensions were high as a launch vehicle of this size had never flown before. The S-I was partially loaded with propellant to lessen the destruction if an anomaly occurred near or on the pad. In the end, the launch was successful and the subsequent SA-5 launch was identified by John F. Kennedy as the launch that put the U.S. above the USSR in terms of lift capability.

== Flight history ==
Mission serial number	Launch date (UTC)	Launch notes
SA-1	October 27, 1961 15:06:04	First test flight. Block I. Suborbital. Range: 398 km. Apogee: 136.5 km. Apogee Mass: 115,700 lb (52,500 kg). Dummy S-IV and S-V stages.
SA-2	April 25, 1962 14:00:34	Second test flight. Block I. Suborbital. 86,000 kg water released at apogee of 145 km as part of Project Highwater. Dummy S-IV and S-V stages.
SA-3	November 16, 1962 17:45:02	Third test flight. Block I. Suborbital. 86,000 kg water released at apogee of 167 km. Dummy S-IV and S-V stages. Second and last Project Highwater flight.
SA-4	March 28, 1963 20:11:55	Fourth test flight. Block I. Suborbital. Dummy S-IV second stage and S-V third stage. Apogee: 129 km. Range: 400 km.
SA-5	January 29, 1964 16:25:01	First live S-IV second stage. First Block II. First to orbit: 760 x 264 km. Mass: 38,700 lb (17,550 kg). Decayed 30 April 1966.
SA-6	May 28, 1964 17:07:00	First Apollo boilerplate CSM launch. Block II. Orbit: 204 x 179 km. Mass: 38,900 lb (17,650 kg). Apollo BP-13 decayed 1 June 1964.
SA-7	September 18, 1964 16:22:43	Second Apollo boilerplate CSM launch. Block II. Orbit: 203 x 178 km. Mass: 36,800 lb (16,700 kg). Apollo BP-15 decayed 22 September 1964.
SA-9	February 16, 1965 14:37:03	Third Apollo boilerplate CSM. First Pegasus micrometeoroid satellite. Orbit: 523 x 430 km. Mass: 3,200 lb (1,450 kg). Pegasus 1 decayed 17 September 1978. Apollo BP-26 decayed 10 July 1985.
SA-8	May 25, 1965 07:35:01	Fourth Apollo boilerplate CSM. Only night launch. Second Pegasus micrometeoroid satellite. Orbit: 594 x 467 km. Mass: 3,200 lb (1,450 kg). Pegasus 2 decayed 3 November 1979. Apollo BP-16 decayed 8 July 1989.
SA-10	July 30, 1965 13:00:00	Third Pegasus micrometeoroid satellite. Orbit: 567 x 535 km. Mass: 3,200 lb (1,450 kg). Pegasus 3 decayed 4 August 1969. Apollo BP-9A decayed 22 November 1975.
