= Rocketdyne =

American rocket engine design and production company

- Industry: Rocket engines
- Founded: 1955
- Defunct: 2005
- Fate: Acquired then merged
- Successor: Pratt & Whitney Rocketdyne
- Headquarters: Canoga Park, California, United States
- Key people: John Leland Atwood; James H. Kindelberger; Samuel Kurtz Hoffman
- Parent: North American Aviation (1955–1967); Rockwell International (1967–1996); Boeing (1996–2005); Pratt & Whitney (2005–2013); Aerojet Rocketdyne (2013–2023); L3Harris (2023–2026)

Rocketdyne was an American rocket engine design and production company headquartered in Canoga Park, in the western San Fernando Valley of suburban Los Angeles, in southern California.

Rocketdyne was founded as a division of North American Aviation in 1955 and was later part of Rockwell International from 1967 until 1996 and Boeing from 1996 to 2005. In 2005, Boeing sold the Rocketdyne division to United Technologies Corporation, becoming Pratt & Whitney Rocketdyne as part of Pratt & Whitney. In 2013, Rocketdyne was sold to GenCorp, Inc., which merged it with Aerojet to form Aerojet Rocketdyne. The space portion of Aerojet Rocketdyne will be spun off as a new company named "Rocketdyne" in the second half of 2026, following an acquisition from L3Harris by AE Industrial Partners.

== History ==
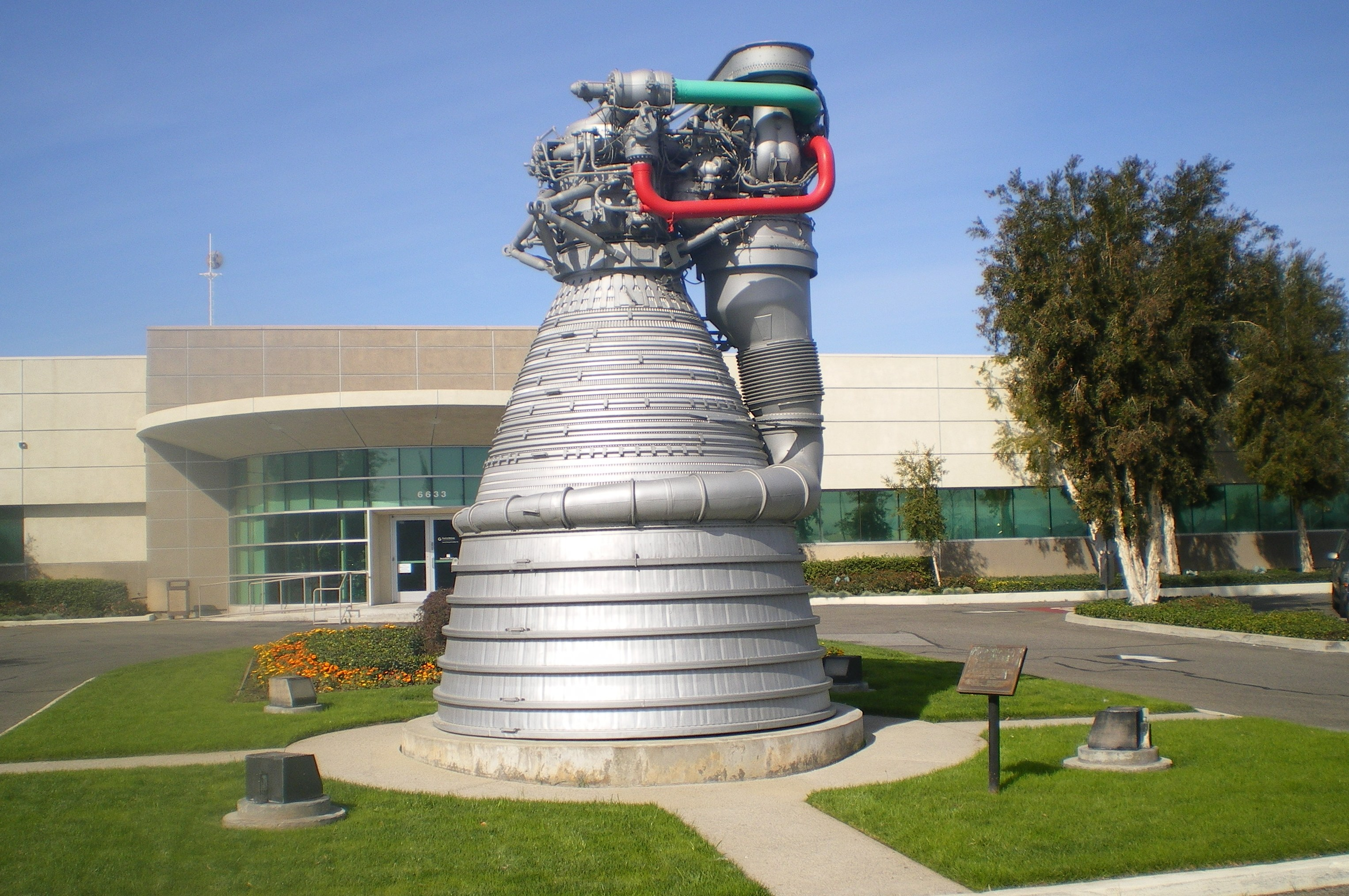
F-1 rocket engine used in the Saturn program, Rocketdyne former main production facility, Canoga Park, Los Angeles

After World War II, North American Aviation (NAA) was contracted by the Defense Department to study the German V-2 missile and adapt its engine to Society of Automotive Engineers (SAE) measurements and U.S. construction details. NAA also used the same general concept of separate burner/injectors from the V-2 engine design to build a much larger engine for the Navaho missile project (1946–1958). This work was considered unimportant in the 1940s and funded at a very low level, but the start of the Korean War in 1950 changed priorities. NAA had begun to use the Santa Susana Field Laboratory (SSFL) high in the Simi Hills around 1947 for the Navaho's rocket engine testing. At that time the site was much farther away from major populated areas than the early test sites NAA had been using within Los Angeles.

Navaho ran into continual difficulties and was canceled in 1958 when the Chrysler Corporation Missile Division's Redstone missile design (essentially an improved V-2) had caught up in development. However the Rocketdyne engine, known as the A-5 or NAA75-110, proved to be considerably more reliable than the one developed for Redstone, so the missile was redesigned with the A-5 even though the resulting missile had much shorter range.

As the missile entered production, NAA spun off Rocketdyne in 1955 as a separate division, and built its new plant in the then small Los Angeles suburb of Canoga Park, in the San Fernando Valley near and below its Santa Susana Field Laboratory.

In 1967, NAA, with its Rocketdyne and Atomics International divisions, merged with the Rockwell Corporation to form North American Rockwell, becoming in 1973 Rockwell International.

=== Thor, Delta, Atlas ===
Rocketdyne's next major development was its first all-new design, the S-3D, which had been developed in parallel to the V-2 derived A series. The S-3 was used on the Army's Jupiter missile design, essentially a development of the Redstone, and was later selected for the competitor Air Force Thor missile. An even larger design, the LR89/LR105, was used on the Atlas missile. The Thor had a short military career, but it was used as a satellite launcher through the 1950s and 60s in a number of different versions. One, Thor Delta, became the baseline for the current Delta series of space launchers, although since the late 1960s the Delta has had almost nothing in common with the Thor. Although the original S-3 engine was used on some Delta versions, most use its updated RS-27 design, originally developed as a single engine to replace the three-engine cluster on the Atlas.

The Atlas also had a short military career as a deterrent weapon, but the Atlas rocket family descended from it became an important orbital launcher for many decades, both for the Project Mercury crewed spacecraft, and in the much-employed Atlas-Agena and Atlas-Centaur rockets. The Atlas V is still in manufacture and use.

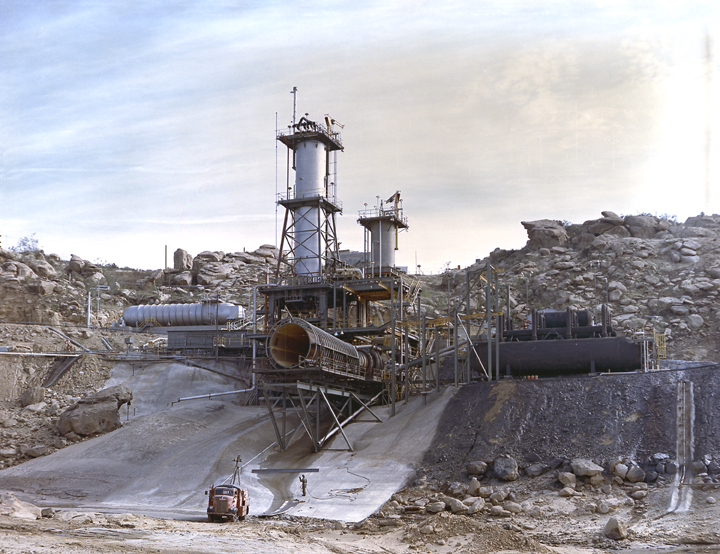
Rocketdyne's test stand for testing the J-2 engine in Santa Susana Mountains

=== NASA ===
Rocketdyne also became the major supplier for NASA's development efforts, supplying all of the major engines for the Saturn rocket, and potentially, the huge Nova rocket designs. Rocketdyne's H-1 engine was used by the Saturn I booster main stage. Five F-1 engines powered the Saturn V's S-IC first stage, while five J-2 engines powered its S-II second stage, and one J-2 the S-IVB third stages. By 1965, Rocketdyne built the vast majority of United States rocket engines, excepting those of the Titan rocket (built by Aerojet), and its payroll had grown to 65,000. This sort of growth appeared to be destined to continue in the 1970s when Rocketdyne won the contract for the RS-25 Space Shuttle Main Engine (SSME), but the rapid downturn in other military and civilian contracts led to downsizing of the company. North American Aviation, largely a spacecraft manufacturer, and also tied almost entirely to the Space Shuttle, merged with the Rockwell Corporation in 1966 to form the North American Rockwell company, which became Rockwell International in 1973, with Rocketdyne as a major division.

=== Downsizing ===
During continued downsizing in the 1980s and 1990s, Rockwell International shed several parts of the former North American Rockwell corporation. The aerospace entities of Rockwell International, including the former NAA and Rocketdyne, were sold to Boeing in 1996. Rocketdyne became part of Boeing's Defense division. In February 2005, Boeing reached an agreement to sell what was by then referred to as "Rocketdyne Propulsion & Power" to Pratt & Whitney of United Technologies Corporation. The transaction was completed on August 2, 2005. Boeing retained ownership of Rocketdyne's Santa Susana Field Lab.

GenCorp, Inc. purchased Pratt & Whitney Rocketdyne in 2013 from United Technologies Corporation, and merged it with Aerojet to form Aerojet Rocketdyne.

== Facilities and operations ==
=== Canoga Park, California ===
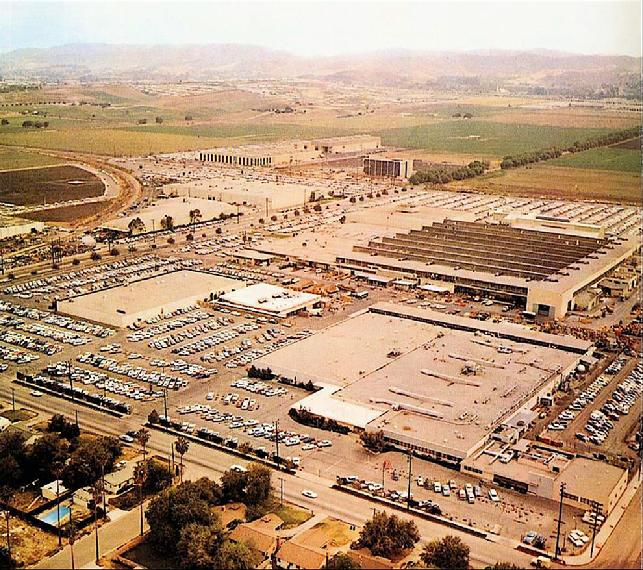
Aerial view of Rocketdyne Canoga Plant in 1960. View is to the southeast. The intersection of Owensmouth and Vanowen streets is seen at lower right while the intersection of Canoga and Victory streets is seen towards the upper center, near the multi-story headquarters building.

Rocketdyne maintained division headquarters and rocket engine manufacturing facilities at Canoga Park from 1955 until 2014.

North American Aviation's rocket development activities began with engine tests nearby the Los Angeles Airport. In 1948, NAA began testing liquid rocket engines within the Simi Hills which would later become the Santa Susana Field Laboratory. The company sought a location for a manufacturing plant nearby the Simi Hills testing site. In 1954, North American Aviation purchased 56 acres of land within the current Warner Center area then deeded the property to the Air Force. The Air Force, in turn, designated the site Air Force Plant No. 56 and contracted with Rocketdyne to build and operate the facility. NAA completed construction of the main manufacturing building and designated Rocketdyne as a new company division in November 1955.

Rocketdyne's success resulted in the addition of buildings within a growing footprint. At its peak, the Rocketdyne Canoga facility comprised some 27 different buildings over 119 acres of land, including over one million square feet of manufacturing area plus 516,000 square feet of office space. The Canoga plant grew into areas both east and southeast of the original location. In 1960, Rocketdyne opened a headquarters building at the southeast corner of Victory Boulevard and Canoga Avenue. A pedestrian tunnel underneath Victory Boulevard east of Canoga Avenue provided access between buildings to the South (including the Headquarters) and those located to the North of the street. (The tunnel was removed in 1973.)

The Canoga plant shrank over time via piecemeal property sales and building demolitions into the 2000s. With the completion of the Apollo program in 1969, Rocketdyne ended the leases of several facilities and returned the headquarters offices to the Canoga Main building. In 1973, Rocketdyne repurchased the Air Force Plant No. 56 property, thereby ending the government designation. The Space Shuttle program ended in 2011, and further reductions followed. Pratt and Whitney retained ownership of the Canoga property when Rocketdyne was sold to Aerojet in 2013; the remaining property measured roughly 47 acres with buildings and structures comprising a total of 770,000 square feet.

Rocketdyne played a key role in the United States space program and the development of propulsion systems. Ten years after being established, the Canoga plant produced the vast majority of America's United States liquid rocket engines (except those of the Titan rocket, them being built by Aerojet). Through the end of the twentieth century, Rocketdyne products powered all major engines for the Saturn program and every space program in the United States.

Six specific periods of liquid rocket engine development and manufacturing programs took place at the Canoga plant: Atlas (1954-late 1960s), Thor (1961-1975), Jupiter (1955-1962), Saturn (1961-1975); Apollo (1961-1972); Space Shuttle (1981-2011). Key rocket engine technologies were advanced at the Rocketdyne Canoga plant: gimbaling of rocket engines, introduction of engine injector baffling plates for improved combustion stability, tubular regenerative cooling, "stage and a half" engine configuration first used on Atlas, thrust chamber ignition using pyrophoric chemicals and electrically controlled starting sequences.

Aerojet Rocketdyne moved its office and manufacturing operations to the De Soto Avenue campus in 2014. Demolition and site clearing of the former Rocketdyne facility in Canoga Park commenced in August 2016. As of February 2019, the future land use of the site has not been announced.

=== McGregor, Texas ===
Rocketdyne's Solid Propulsion Operations business unit was engaged in the development, testing and production of solid rocket engines at McGregor, Texas for nearly twenty years.

The Rocket Fuels Division of Phillips Petroleum Company began using the former Bluebonnet Ordnance Plant in 1952. In 1958, Phillips and Rocketdyne entered a partnership to form Astrodyne Incorporated. In 1959, Rocketdyne purchased full ownership of the company and renamed it Solid Propulsion Operations (later designated the Solid Rocket Division). The purchase caused Rocketdyne to invest in facilities and research at McGregor towards diversification into other propellant types and rockets engines. Notably, Rocketdyne installed a facility capable of testing engines having up to three million pounds of thrust.

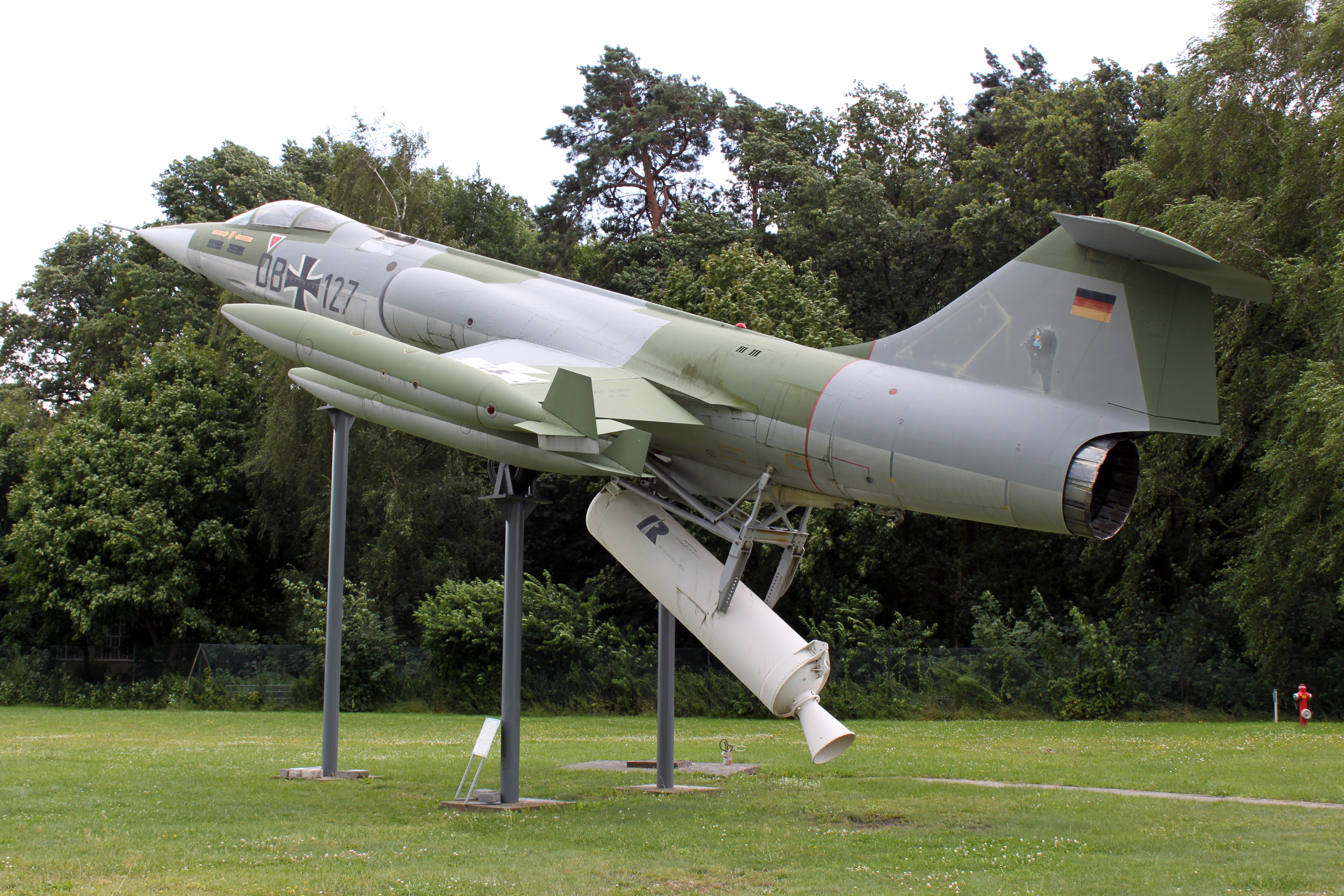
Static display of a Lockheed F-104G aircraft in German National livery fitted with a Rocketdyne zero length launch rocket engine.

The Solid Propulsion Operations initially used ammonium nitrate-based propellants in the manufacture of gas generators used to start aircraft jet engines, turbopumps of the Rocketdyne H-1 rocket engine and the manufacture of the Jet Assisted Take Off (JATO) rocket engines. Ullage motors were developed for the Saturn V Space Vehicle. The group also built solid propellant boosters providing for the zero-length launching of North American F-100 Super Sabre and Lockheed F-104 Starfighter aircraft. The motor provided a takeoff thrust of 130,000 lbf for 4 seconds, accelerating the aircraft to 275 miles per hour and 4 g before separating and dropping away from the jet.

In 1959, the group began using ammonium perchlorate oxidizer combined with carboxyl-terminated polybutadiene (CTPB) binder to produce solid propellants marketed under the trade name "Flexadyne." For the next nineteen years, Rocketdyne used the formulation in the production of solid rocket motors for three major missile systems: the AIM-7 Sparrow III, AGM-45 Shrike, and the AIM-54 Phoenix. Rocketdyne transferred operation of the McGregor plant to Hercules Inc. in 1978. A portion of the former Bluebonnet Ordnance Plant is now used by SpaceX as their Rocket Development and Test Facility.

=== Neosho, Missouri ===
A rocket engine manufacturing plant was operated by Rocketdyne over a twelve-year period at Neosho, Missouri. The plant was constructed by the U.S. Air Force within a 2,000-acre portion of Fort Crowder, a decommissioned World War II training base. The Rocketdyne division of North American Aviation operated the site, employing approximately 1,250 workers beginning in 1956. The plant primarily produced the MA-5 booster, sustainer and vernier rocket engines, H-1 engines and components for the F-1 and J-2 rocket engines. The P4-1 (a.k.a. LR64) engine was also manufactured for the AQM-37A target drone. The engines and components were evaluated at an on-site test area located approximately one mile from the plant. Rocketdyne closed the plant in 1968. The plant has been used by several different companies for the refurbishment of jet aircraft engines. The citizens of Neosho have placed a commemorative monument dedicated to the men and women of Rocketdyne Neosho "whose tireless efforts and relentless pursuit of quality resulted in the world's finest liquid rocket engines."

=== Nevada Field Laboratory ===
Rocketdyne established and operated a 120,000 acre rocket engine test and development facility nearby Reno, Nevada from 1962 until 1970. The Nevada Field Laboratory had three active open-air test facilities and two administrative areas. The test facilities were used for the Gemini and Apollo space programs, the annular aerospike engine and the early (proposal-stage) development of the Space Shuttle main engine.

== Power generation ==
In addition to its primary business of building rocket engines, Rocketdyne has developed power generation and control systems. These included early nuclear power generation experiments, radioisotope thermoelectric generators (RTG), and solar power equipment, including the main power system for the International Space Station and pioneering work in tower type concentrating solar power in The Solar Project.

In the Boeing sale to Pratt & Whitney, the Power Systems division of Rocketdyne was transferred to Hamilton Sundstrand, another subsidiary of United Technologies Corporation.

== List of engines ==
Some of the engines developed by Rocketdyne are:

- Rocketdyne A1 to A6 (LOX/Alcohol) Used on Redstone
- Rocketdyne A7 (LOX/Alcohol) Used on Jupiter-C
- Rocketdyne 16NS-1,000
- Rocketdyne Kiwi Nuclear rocket engine
- Rocketdyne M-34
- Rocketdyne MA-2
- Rocketdyne MA-3
- Rocketdyne Megaboom modular sled rocket
- Rocketdyne P
- Rocketdyne LR64
- Rocketdyne LR70
- Rocketdyne LR79 family:
  - XLR83-NA-1 - Navaho G-26
  - XLR89-1 - Atlas A
  - LR79-7 - Thor, Delta, Thor-Able, Thor-Agena A, Thor Agena B, Thor Agena D, Thor-Burner
  - S-3D - Jupiter
  - XLR89-1 - Atlas A, B, C
  - XLR71-NA-1 - Navaho II
  - B-2C - Atlas A
  - XLR89-5 - Atlas D
  - S-3 - Juno II, Saturn A-2
  - MB-3-1 - Delta A, B, C, Thor Ablestar
  - LR89-5 - Atlas E, F
  - H-1 - Saturn I/IB
  - MB-3 Press Mod - Sea Horse
  - LR89-7 - Atlas LV-3C, Atlas Agena, Atlas Centaur, Atlas F/Agena D, Atlas H, Atlas G, Atlas I
  - MB-3-3 - H-I
  - RZ.2 - Europa
  - H-1c - Saturn IB-A, IB-B
  - H-1b - Saturn B-1, Saturn A-2, Saturn IB, Saturn IB-C, Saturn IB-CE, Saturn IB-D, Saturn INT-11, Saturn INT-12, Saturn INT-13, Saturn INT-14, Saturn INT-15.
  - RS-27 - N-I, N-II, Delta 1000, Delta 4000, Delta 5000, Delta 2000, Delta 3000
  - MB-3-J - N
  - RS-27A - Delta 6925, Delta 6920-8, Delta 6925-8, Delta 6920-10, Delta 8930
  - RS-27C - Barbarian MDD, Delta 7925
  - RS-56-OBA - Atlas II, IIA, IIAS
- Rocketdyne LR-101 Vernier engine used by Atlas, Thor and Delta
- Rocketdyne LR105 family:
  - S-4 - Super-Jupiter
  - XLR105-5 - Atlas Able, Atlas B, Atlas C, Atlas LV-3C, Atlas D, Atlas-Agena, Atlas LV-3B
  - LR105-3
  - LR105-5 - Atlas LV-3C, Atlas E, Atlas Agena B, Atlas F, Atlas Agena D, Atlas Centaur D, Atlas SLV-3
  - LR105-7 - Atlas Agena D, Atlas F/Agena D, Atlas H, Atlas G, Atlas I
  - RS-56-OSA - Atlas II, IIA, IIAS
- Rocketdyne Aeolus
- Rocketdyne XRS-2200, linear aerospike engine, tested for X-33
- Rocketdyne RS-2200, linear aerospike engine, intended for Venturestar
- Rocketdyne E-1 (RP-1/LOX) Backup design for the Titan I
- Rocketdyne F-1 (RP-1/LOX) Used by the Saturn V.
- Rocketdyne H-1 (RP-1/LOX) Used by the Saturn I and IB
- Rocketdyne J-2 (LH2/LOX) Used by both the Saturn V and Saturn IB.
- Rocketdyne RS-25 Space Shuttle Main Engine (SSME) (LH2/LOX) The main engine for the Space Shuttle, also used on the Space Launch System
- Rocketdyne RS-27A (RP-1/LOX) Used by the Delta II/III and Atlas ICBM
- Rocketdyne RS-56 (RP-1/LOX) Used by the Atlas II first stage
- Rocketdyne RS-68 (LH2/LOX) Used by the Delta IV first stage
- Rocketdyne XLR46-NA-2, intended for the North American NA-247 interceptor proposal

== Gallery ==
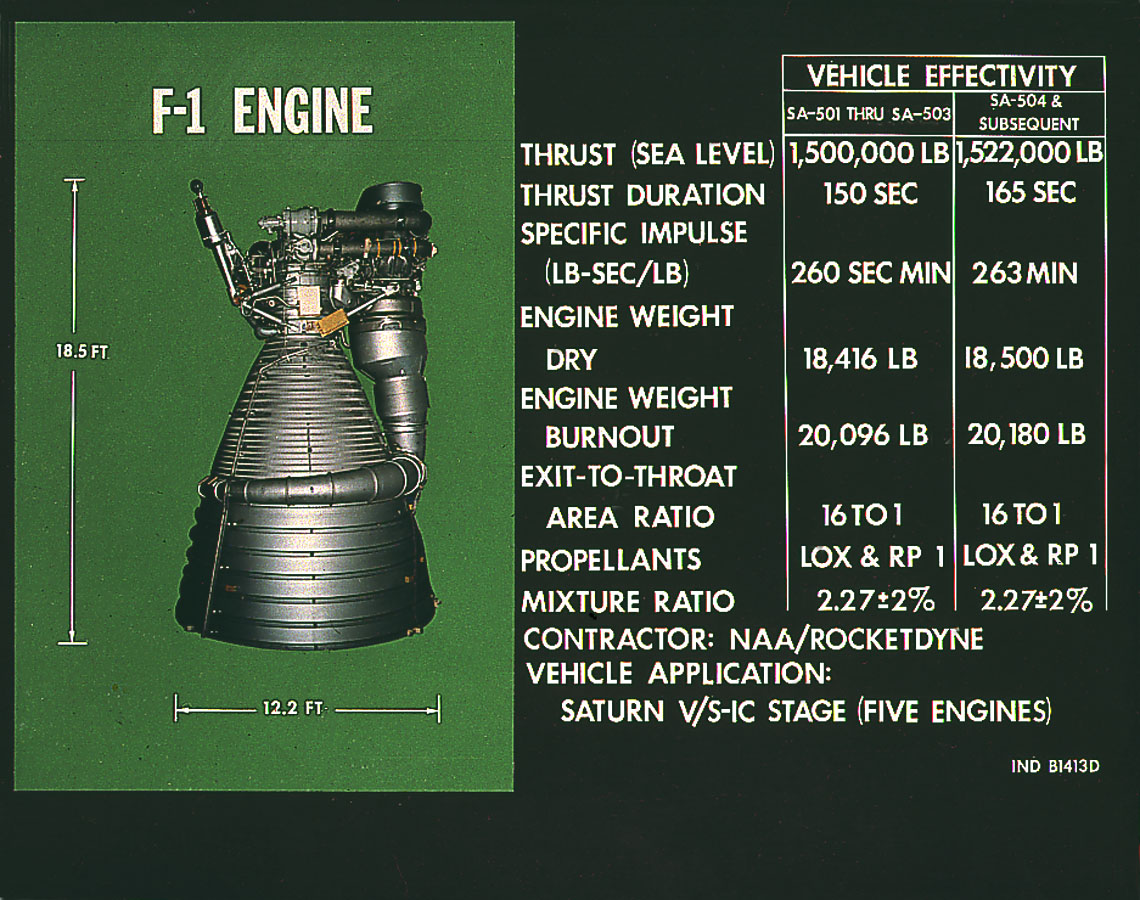
F-1 (Saturn V)

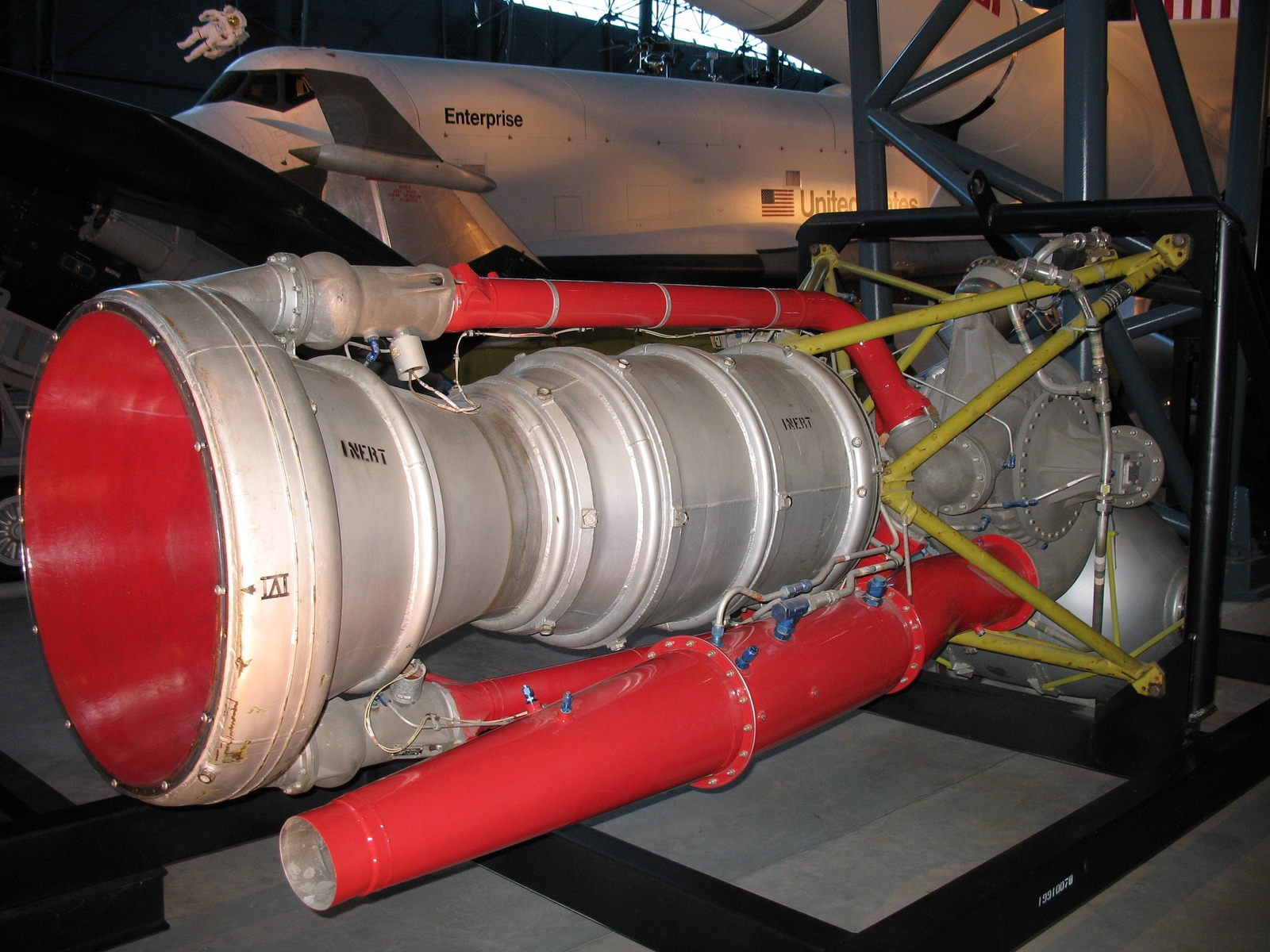
Rocketdyne 75-110-A-6 (Redstone)

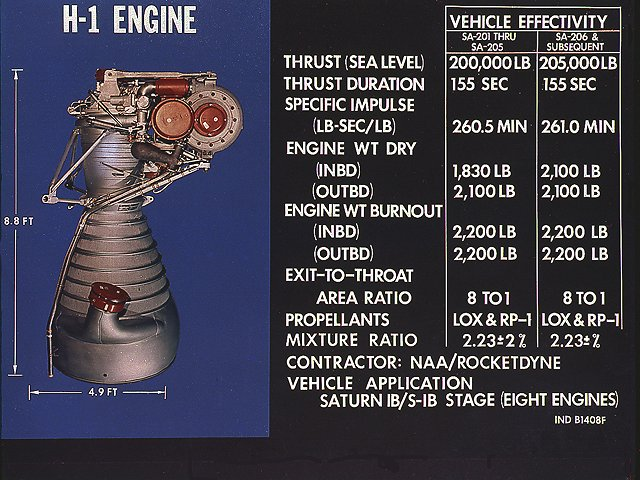
H-1 (Saturn I & IB)

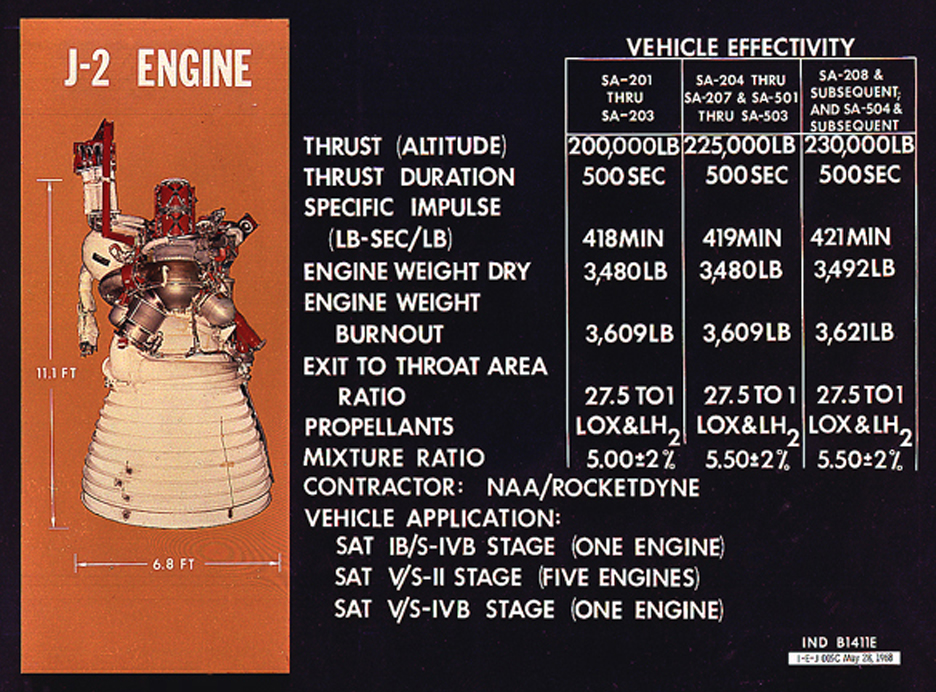
J-2 (Saturn IB & V)

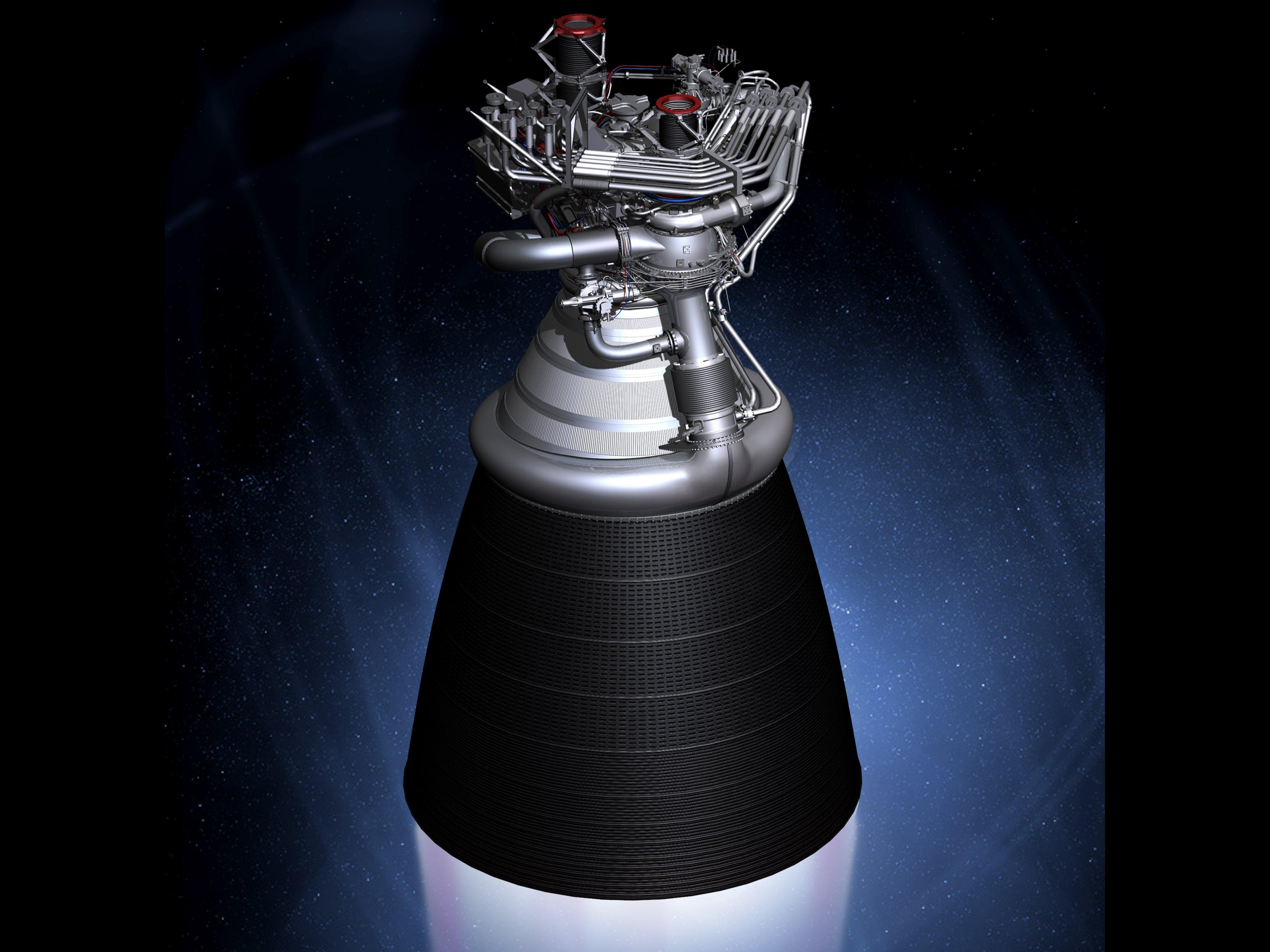
J-2X rocket engine (concept image)

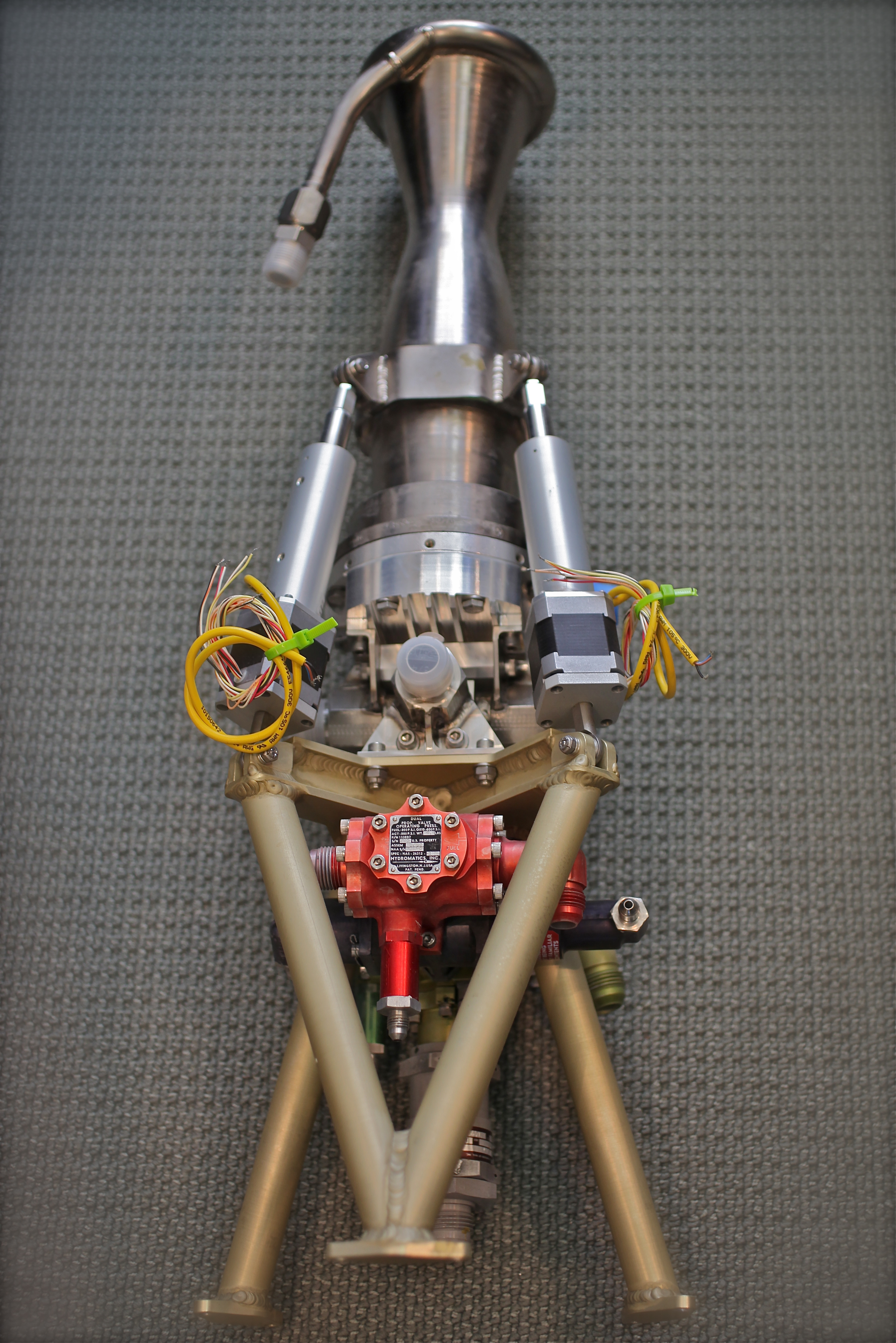
LR101 (Mercury Atlas vernier motor)

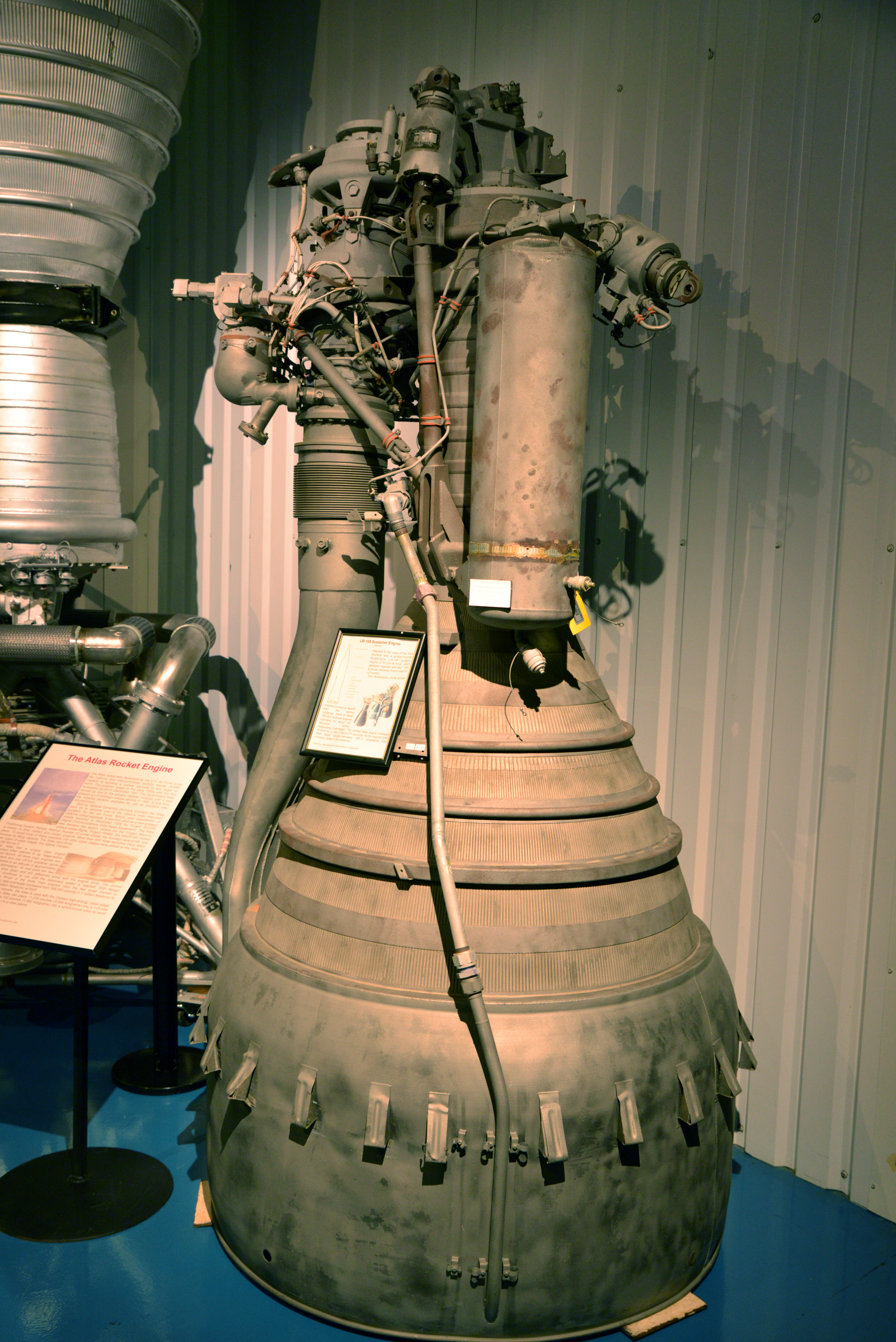
LR-105 (Atlas sustainer)

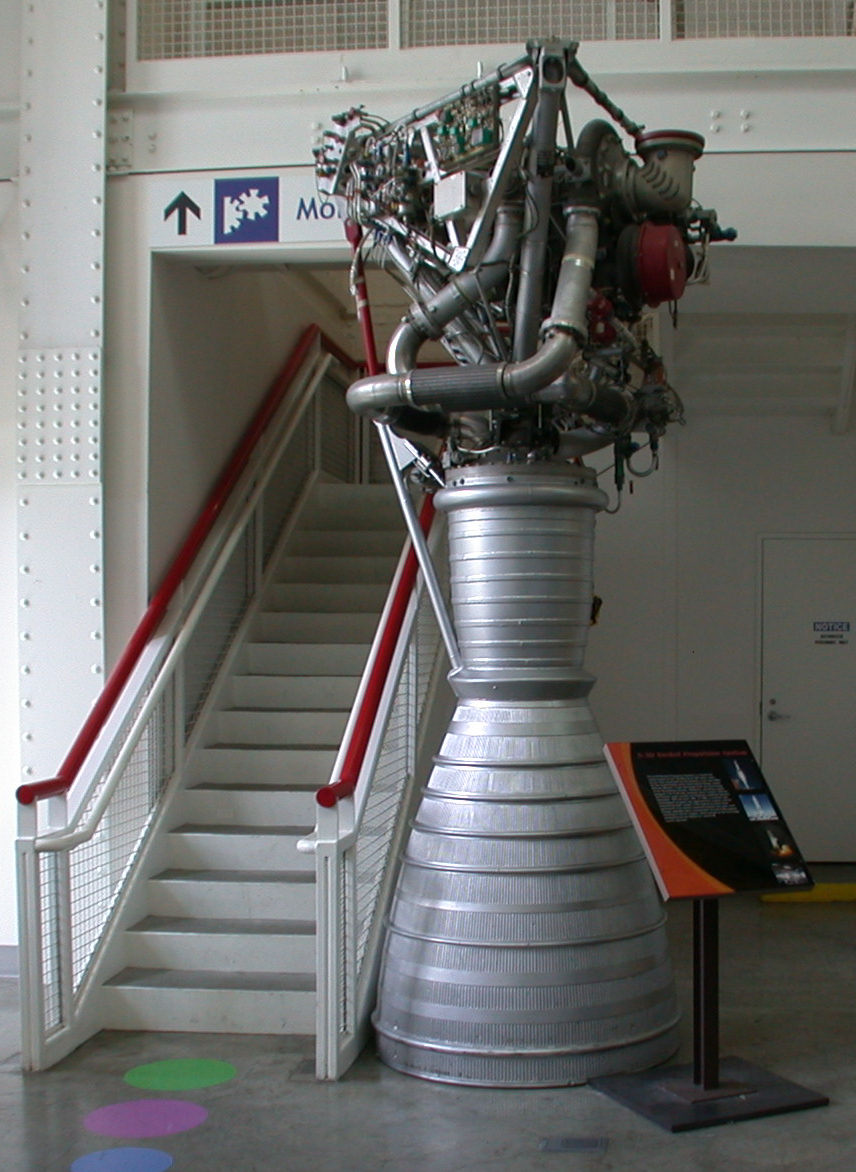
LR-79 / MB3 (Thor ICBM)

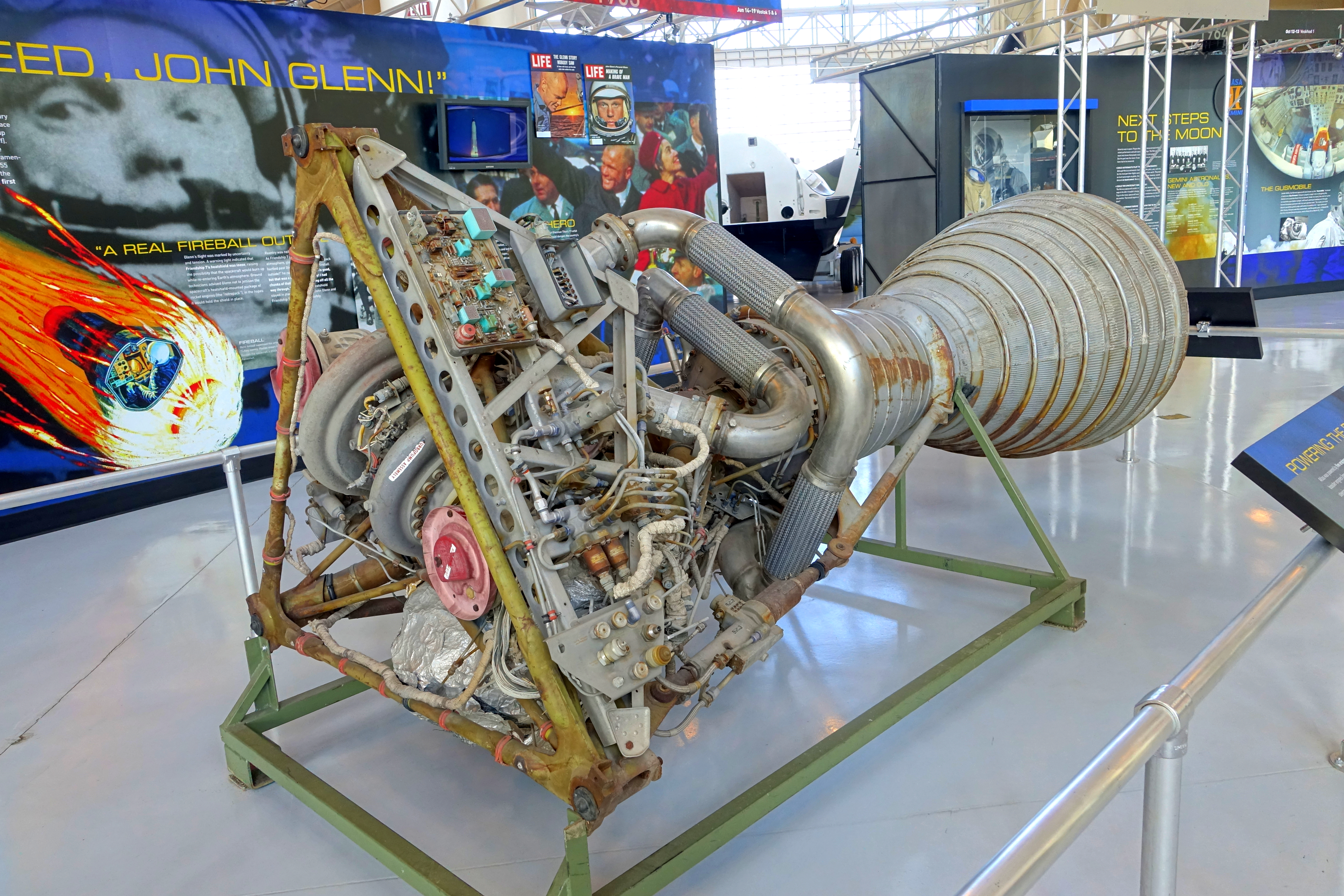
LR89 (Atlas)

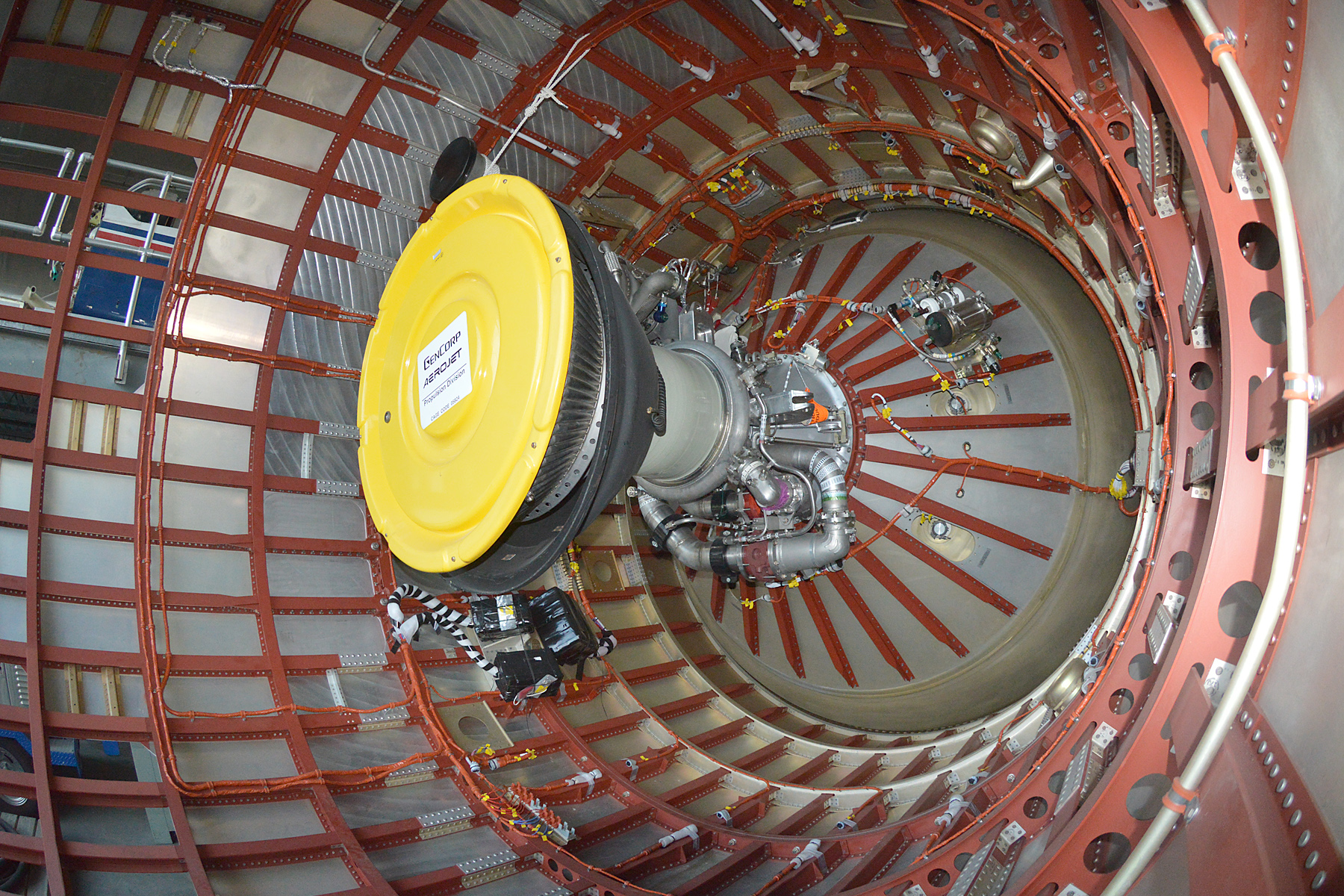
LR91-AJ-11 (Titan 4B upper stage)

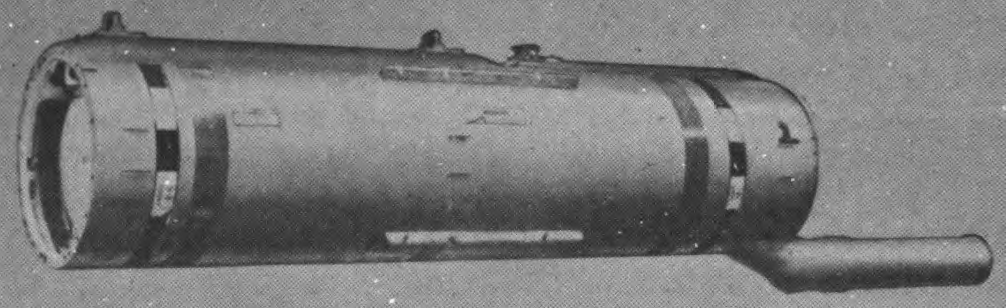
MK 70 (AGM-53 Condor)

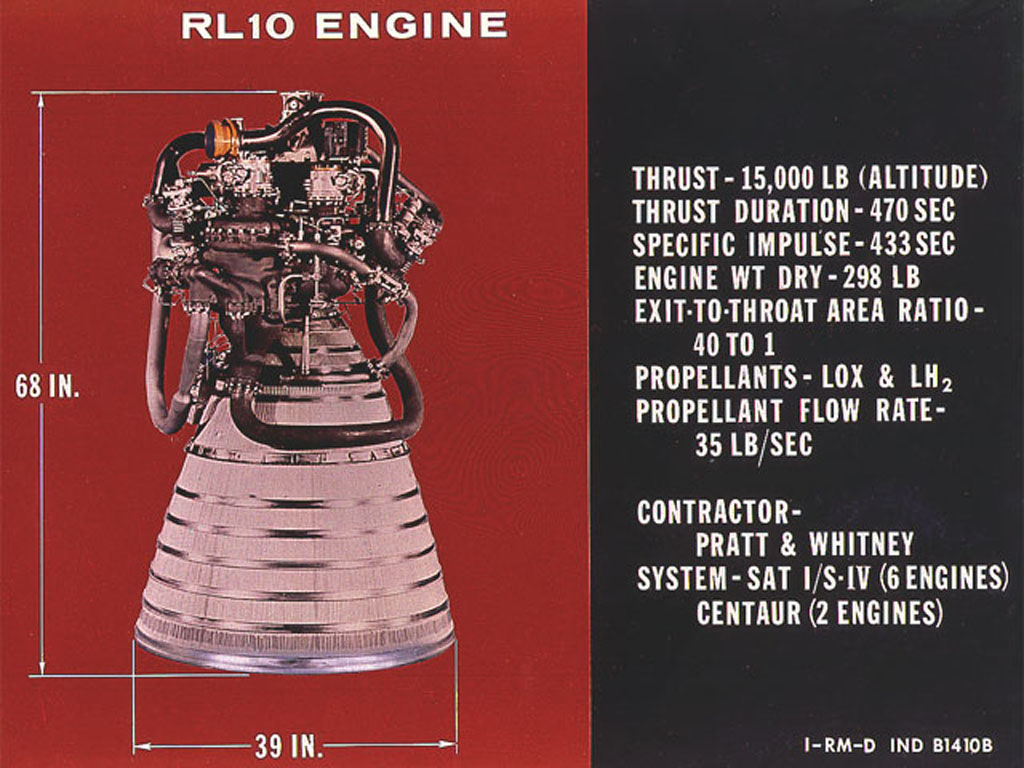
RL-10 (Centaur & DCSS)

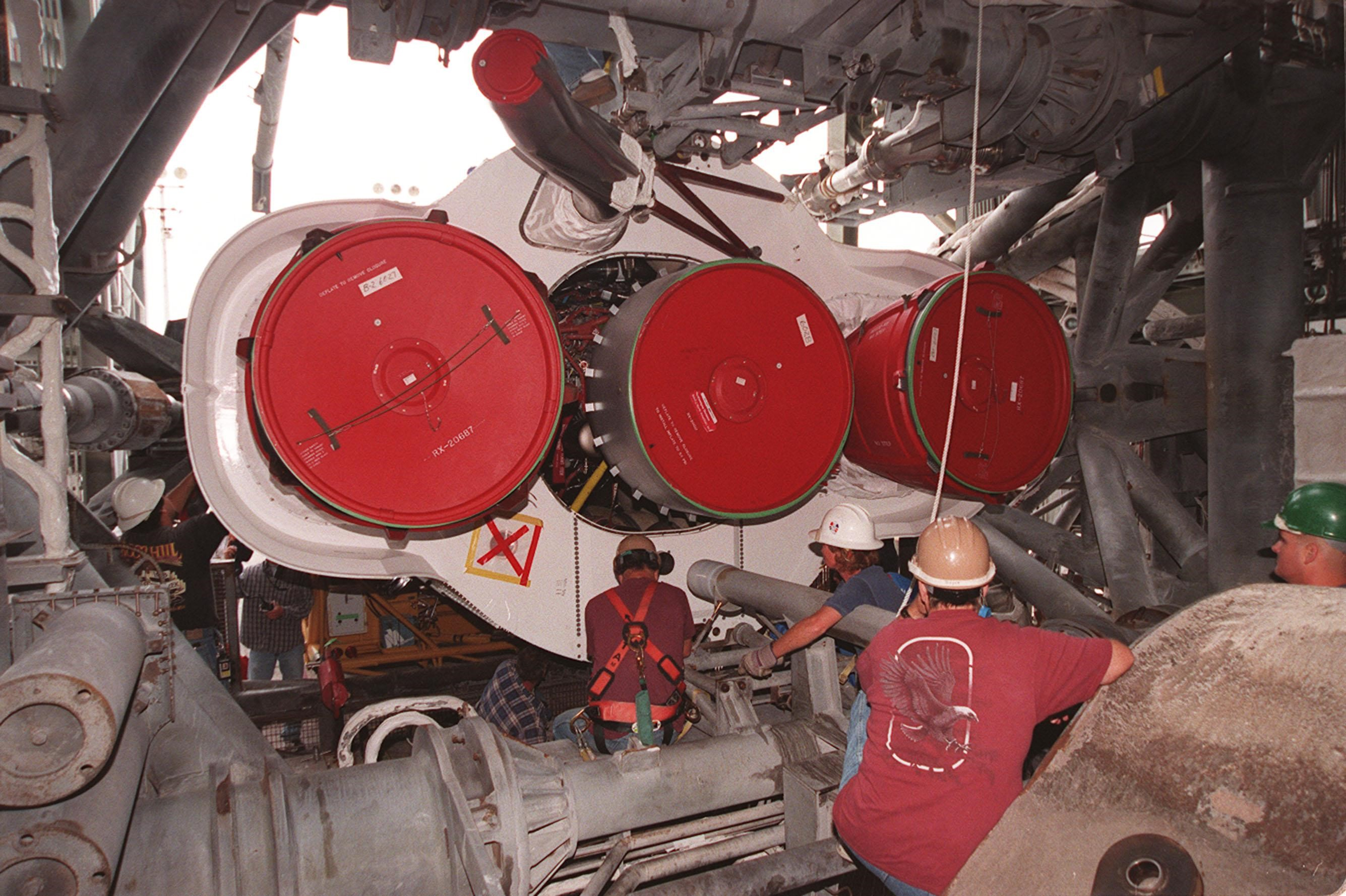
RS-56 (Atlas II)

== Notable employees ==
- Owsley Stanley, sound engineer and clandestine LSD chemist
- Vint Cerf, American internet pioneer

== See also ==
- Rocketdyne engines
- Aerojet Rocketdyne
- Pratt & Whitney Rocketdyne
- Atomics International Division
- Santa Susana Field Laboratory
