= Saturn (rocket family) =

Family of American heavy-lift rocket launch vehicles

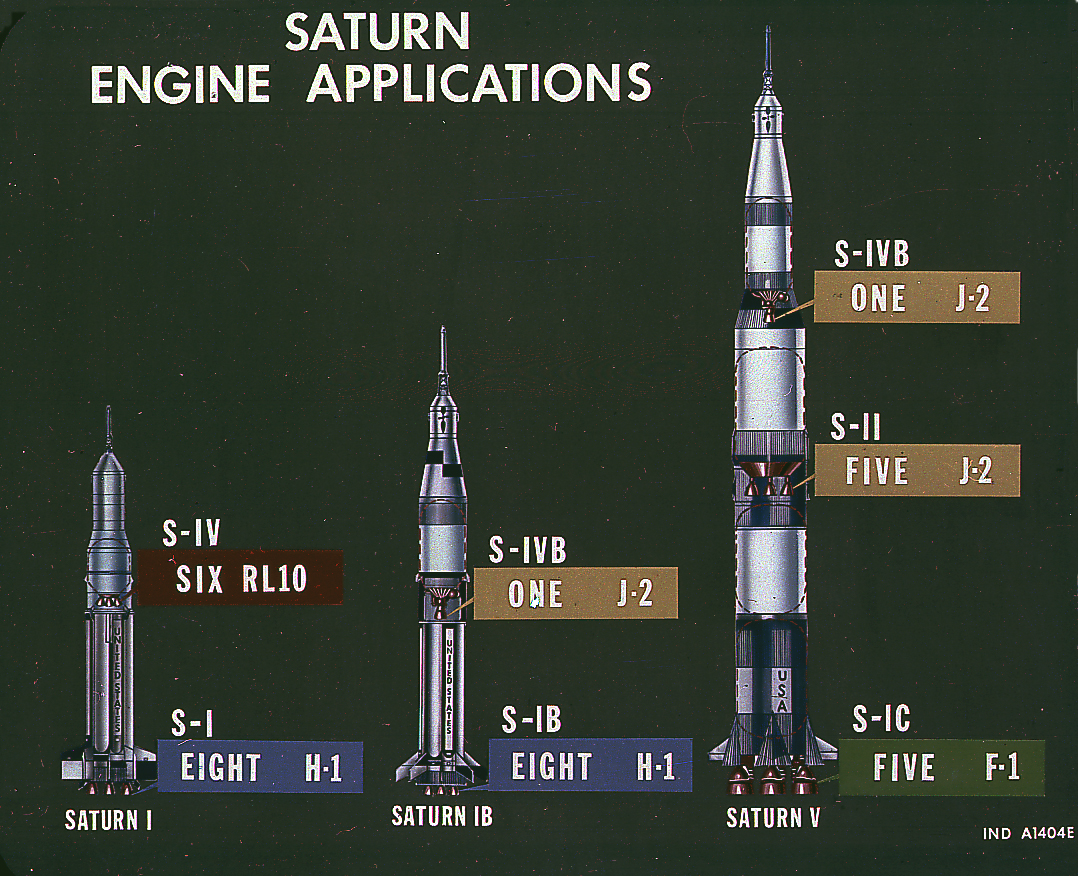
Three variants of the Saturn family which were developed: Saturn I, Saturn IB, and Saturn V

The Saturn family of American rockets was developed by a team led by Wernher von Braun and other former Peenemünde employees to launch heavy payloads to Earth orbit and beyond. The Saturn family used liquid hydrogen as fuel in the upper stages. Originally proposed as a military satellite launcher, they were adopted as the launch vehicles for the Apollo Moon program. Three versions were built and flown: the medium-lift Saturn I, the heavy-lift Saturn IB, and the super heavy-lift Saturn V.

Von Braun proposed the Saturn name in October 1958 as a logical successor to the Jupiter series as well as the Roman god's powerful position.

In 1963, President John F. Kennedy identified the Saturn I SA-5 launch as being the point where US lift capability would surpass the Soviets, after having been behind since Sputnik. He last mentioned this in a speech given at Brooks Air Force Base in San Antonio on the day before he was assassinated.

The Saturn V was the first of two launch vehicles to transport human beings beyond low Earth orbit, the other being the Space Launch System (SLS). A total of 24 humans were flown to the Moon in the four years spanning December 1968 through December 1972. No Saturn rocket failed catastrophically in flight, except on the pad during the Apollo 1 test flight, when a fire ignited in the crew module, killing all of the astronauts on board.

== Summary of variants ==
All the Saturn family rockets are listed here by date of introduction.

Name	Serial number	Function	Maiden flight	Final flight	Launches			Remarks
Name	Serial number	Function	Maiden flight	Final flight	Total	Success	Failure (+ partial)	Remarks
Saturn I Block I	SA–1–4	Development	October 27, 1961	March 28, 1963	4	4	0	Live first stage only
Saturn I Block II	SA–5–10	Development	January 29, 1964	July 30, 1965	6	6	0	Carried Apollo boilerplate CSM and Pegasus micrometeoroid satellites
Saturn IB	SA–200	Apollo spacecraft Earth orbital carrier	February 26, 1966	July 15, 1975	9	9	0	Used for Apollo 7, Skylab crews and Apollo–Soyuz Test Project
Saturn V	SA–500	Apollo spacecraft lunar carrier	November 9, 1967	May 14, 1973	13	12	1 (Note: Apollo 6 had engine failures in second and third stage, preventing restart. Spacecraft still attained orbit.)	Launched nine crewed lunar missions and the Skylab space station

== History ==
=== Early development ===
In the early 1950s, the US Navy and US Army actively developed long-range missiles with the help of German rocket engineers who were involved in developing the successful V-2 during the Second World War. These missiles included the Navy's Viking, and the Army's Corporal, Jupiter and Redstone. Meanwhile, the US Air Force developed its Atlas and Titan missiles, relying more on American engineers.

Infighting among the various branches was constant, with the United States Department of Defense (DoD) deciding which projects to fund for development. On November 26, 1956, Defense Secretary Charles E. Wilson issued a memorandum stripping the Army of offensive missiles with a range of 200 miles (320 km) or greater, and turning their Jupiter missiles over to the Air Force. From that point on, the Air Force would be the primary missile developer, especially for dual-use missiles that could also be used as space launch vehicles.

In late 1956, the Department of Defense released a requirement for a heavy-lift vehicle to orbit a new class of communications and "other" satellites (the spy satellite program was top secret). The requirements, drawn up by the then-unofficial Advanced Research Projects Agency (ARPA), called for a vehicle capable of putting 9,000 to 18,000 kilograms into orbit, or accelerating 2,700 to 5,400 kg to escape velocity.

Since the Wilson memorandum covered only weapons, not space vehicles, the Army Ballistic Missile Agency (ABMA) saw this as a way to continue the development of their own large-rocket projects. In April 1957, von Braun directed Heinz-Hermann Koelle, chief of the Future Projects design branch, to study dedicated launch vehicle designs that could be built as quickly as possible. Koelle evaluated a variety of designs for missile-derived launchers that could place a maximum of about 1,400 kg in orbit, but might be expanded to as much as 4,500 kg with new high-energy upper stages. In any event, these upper stages would not be available until 1961 or 1962 at the earliest, and the launchers would still not meet the DoD requirements for heavy loads.

In order to fill the projected need for loads of 10,000 kg or greater, the ABMA team calculated that a booster (first stage) with a thrust of about 1,500,000 lbf (6,700 kN) thrust would be needed, far greater than any existing or planned missile. For this role they proposed using a number of existing missiles clustered together to produce a single larger booster; using existing designs they looked at combining tankage from one Jupiter as a central core, with eight Redstone diameter tanks attached to it. This relatively cheap configuration allowed existing fabrication and design facilities to be used to produce this "quick and dirty" design.

Two approaches to building the Super-Jupiter were considered; the first used multiple engines to reach the 1,500,000 lbf (6,700 kN) mark, the second used a single much larger engine. Both approaches had their own advantages and disadvantages. Building a smaller engine for clustered use would be a relatively low-risk path from existing systems, but required duplication of systems and made the possibility of a stage failure much higher (adding engines generally reduces reliability, as per Lusser's law). A single larger engine would be more reliable, and would offer higher performance because it eliminated duplication of "dead weight" like propellant plumbing and hydraulics for steering the engines. On the downside, an engine of this size had never been built before and development would be expensive and risky. The Air Force had recently expressed an interest in such an engine, which would develop into the famed F-1, but at the time they were aiming for 1,000,000 lbf (4,400 kN) and the engines would not be ready until the mid-1960s. The engine-cluster appeared to be the only way to meet the requirements on time and budget.

Super-Jupiter was the first-stage booster only; to place payloads in orbit, additional upper stages would be needed. ABMA proposed using either the Titan or Atlas as a second stage, optionally with the new Centaur upper-stage. The Centaur had been proposed by General Dynamics (Astronautics Corp.) as an upper stage for the Atlas (also their design) in order to quickly produce a launcher capable of placing loads up to 8,500 lb (3,900 kg) into low Earth orbit. The Centaur was based on the same "balloon tank" concept as the Atlas, and built on the same jigs at the same 120-inch (3,000 mm) diameter. As the Titan was deliberately built at the same size as well, this meant the Centaur could be used with either missile. Given that the Atlas was the higher priority of the two ICBM projects and its production was fully accounted for, ABMA focused on "backup" design, Titan, although they proposed extending it in length in order to carry additional fuel.

In December 1957, ABMA delivered Proposal: A National Integrated Missile and Space Vehicle Development Program to the DoD, detailing their clustered approach. They proposed a booster consisting of a Jupiter missile airframe surrounded by eight Redstones acting as tankage, a thrust plate at the bottom, and four Rocketdyne E-1 engines, each having 380,000 lbf (1,700 kN) of thrust. The ABMA team also left the design open to future expansion with a single 1,500,000 lbf (6,700 kN) engine, which would require relatively minor changes to the design. The upper stage was the lengthened Titan, with the Centaur on top. The result was a very tall and skinny rocket, quite different from the Saturn that eventually emerged.

Specific uses were forecast for each of the military services, including navigation satellites for the Navy; reconnaissance, communications, and meteorological satellites for the Army and Air Force; support for Air Force crewed missions; and surface-to-surface logistics supply for the Army at distances up to 6400 km. Development and testing of the lower stage stack were projected to be completed by 1963, about the same time that the Centaur should become available for testing in combination. The total development cost of $850 million during the years 1958-1963 covered 30 research and development flights.

=== Sputnik stuns the world ===
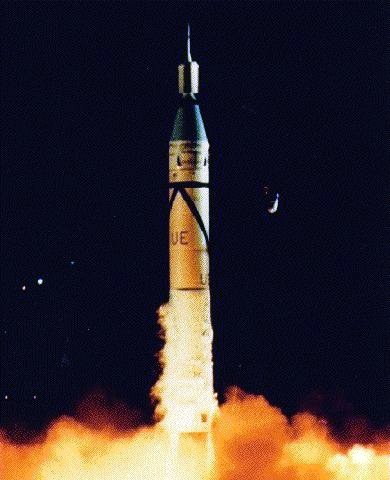
Jupiter C launching Explorer I (1958)

While the Super-Jupiter program was being drawn up, preparations were underway for the first satellite launch as the US contribution to the International Geophysical Year in 1957. For complex political reasons, the program had been given to the US Navy under Project Vanguard. The Vanguard launcher consisted of a Viking lower stage combined with new uppers adapted from sounding rockets. ABMA provided valuable support on Viking and Vanguard, both with their first-hand knowledge of the V-2, as well as developing its guidance system. The first three Vanguard suborbital test flights had gone off without a hitch, starting in December 1956, and a launch was planned for late 1957.

On October 4, 1957, the Soviet Union surprised the world with the launch of Sputnik I. Although there had been some indications that the Soviets were working towards this goal, few in the U.S. military and scientific establishment considered these efforts seriously.

When asked in November 1954 about the possibility of the Soviets launching a satellite, Defense Secretary Wilson replied: "I wouldn't care if they did." The public did not see it the same way, however, and the event was a major public relations disaster for the US. Vanguard was planned to launch shortly after Sputnik, but a series of delays pushed this into December, when the rocket exploded in spectacular fashion. The press was harsh, referring to the project as "Kaputnik" or "Project Rearguard". As Time magazine noted at the time:

But in the midst of the cold war, Vanguard's cool scientific goal proved to be disastrously modest: the Russians got there first. The post-Sputnik White House explanation that the U.S. was not in a satellite "race" with Russia was not just an after-the-fact alibi. Said Dr. Hagen ten months ago: "We are not attempting in any way to race with the Russians". But in the eyes of the world, the U.S. was in a satellite race whether it wanted to be or not, and because of the Administration's costly failure of imagination, Project Vanguard shuffled along when it should have been running. It was still shuffling when Sputnik's beeps told the world that Russia's satellite program, not the U.S.'s, was the vanguard.

Von Braun responded to Sputnik I's launch by claiming he could have a satellite in orbit within 90 days of being given a go-ahead. His plan was to combine the existing Jupiter C rocket (confusingly, a Redstone adaptation, not a Jupiter) with the solid-fuel engines from the Vanguard, producing the Juno I. There was no immediate response while everyone waited for Vanguard to launch, but the continued delays in Vanguard and the November launch of Sputnik II resulted in the go-ahead being given that month. Von Braun kept his promise with the successful launch of Explorer I on 1 February 1958. Vanguard was finally successful on March 17, 1958.

=== ARPA selects Juno ===
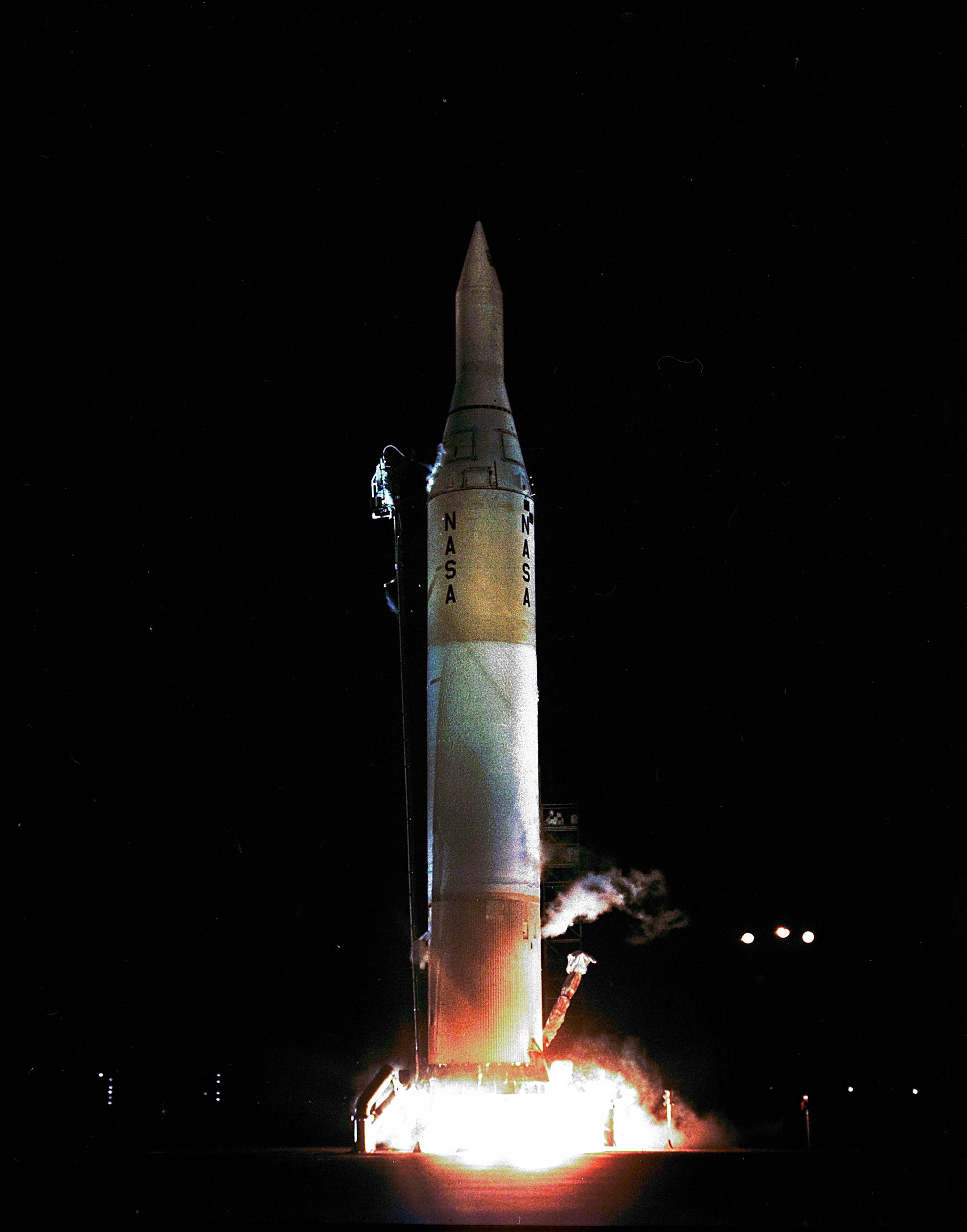
Juno II launching Pioneer IV on March 3, 1959

Concerned that the Soviets continued to surprise the U.S. with technologies that seemed beyond their capabilities, the DoD studied the problem and concluded that it was primarily bureaucratic. As all of the branches of the military had their own research and development programs, there was considerable duplication and inter-service fighting for resources. Making matters worse, the DoD imposed its own Byzantine procurement and contracting rules, adding considerable overhead. To address these concerns, the DoD initiated the formation of a new research and development group focused on launch vehicles and given wide discretionary powers that cut across traditional Army/Navy/Air Force lines. The group was given the job of catching up to the Soviets in space technology as quickly as possible, using whatever technology it could, regardless of the origin. Formalized as Advanced Research Projects Agency (ARPA) on February 7, 1958, the group examined the DoD launcher requirements and compared the various approaches that were currently available.

At the same time that ABMA was drawing up the Super-Jupiter proposal, the Air Force was in the midst of working on their Titan C concept. The Air Force had gained valuable experience working with liquid hydrogen on the Lockheed CL-400 Suntan spy plane project and felt confident in their ability to use this volatile fuel for rockets. They had already accepted Krafft Ehricke's arguments that hydrogen was the only practical fuel for upper stages, and started the Centaur project based on the strength of these arguments. Titan C was a hydrogen-burning intermediate stage that would normally sit between the Titan lower and Centaur upper, or could be used without the Centaur for low-Earth orbit missiles like Dyna-Soar. However, as hydrogen is much less dense than "traditional" fuels then in use, especially kerosene, the upper stage would have to be fairly large in order to hold enough fuel. As the Atlas and Titan were both built at 120" diameters it would make sense to build Titan C at this diameter as well, but this would result in an unwieldy tall and skinny rocket with dubious strength and stability. Instead, Titan C proposed building the new stage at a larger 160" diameter, meaning it would be an entirely new rocket.

In comparison, the Super-Jupiter design was based on off-the-shelf components, with the exception of the E-1 engines. Although it too relied on the Centaur for high-altitude missions, the rocket was usable for low-Earth orbit without Centaur, which offered some flexibility in case Centaur ran into problems. ARPA agreed that the Juno proposal was more likely to meet the timeframes required, although they felt that there was no strong reason to use the E-1, and recommended a lower-risk approach here as well. ABMA responded with a new design, the Juno V (as a continuation of the Juno I and Juno II series of rockets, while Juno III and IV were unbuilt Atlas- and Titan-derived concepts), which replaced the four E-1 engines with eight H-1s, a much more modest upgrade of the existing S-3D already used on the Thor and Jupiter missiles, raising thrust from 150,000 to 188,000 lbf (670 to 840 kN). It was estimated that this approach would save as much as $60 million in development and cut as much as two years of R&D time.

Happy with the results of the redesign, on August 15, 1958, ARPA issued Order Number 14-59 that called on ABMA to:

Initiate a development program to provide a large space vehicle booster of approximately 1 500 000-lb. thrust based on a cluster of available rocket engines. The immediate goal of this program is to demonstrate a full-scale captive dynamic firing by the end of CY 1959.

This was followed on September 11, 1958, with another contract with Rocketdyne to start work on the H-1. On September 23, 1958, ARPA and the Army Ordnance Missile Command (AOMC) drew up an additional agreement enlarging the scope of the program, stating "In addition to the captive dynamic firing..., it is hereby agreed that this program should now be extended to provide for a propulsion flight test of this booster by approximately September 1960". Further, they wanted ABMA to produce three additional boosters, the last two of which would be "capable of placing limited payloads in orbit."

By this point, many in the ABMA group were already referring to the design as Saturn, as von Braun explained it as a reference to the planet after Jupiter. The name change became official in February 1959.

=== NASA involvement ===
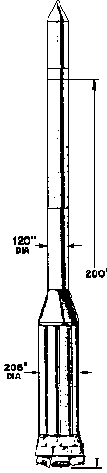
Saturn I configuration for Project Horizon (1959)

In addition to ARPA, various groups within the US government had been considering the formation of a civilian agency to handle space exploration. After the Sputnik launch, these efforts gained urgency and were quickly moved forward. NASA was formed on July 29, 1958, and immediately set about studying the problem of crewed space flight, and the launchers needed to work in this field. One goal, even in this early stage, was a crewed lunar mission. At the time, the NASA panels felt that the direct ascent mission profile was the best approach; this placed a single very large spacecraft in orbit, which was capable of flying to the Moon, landing and returning to Earth. To launch such a large spacecraft, a new booster with much greater power would be needed; even the Saturn was not nearly large enough. NASA started examining a number of potential rocket designs under their Nova program.

NASA was not alone in studying crewed lunar missions. Von Braun had always expressed an interest in this goal, and had been studying what would be required for a lunar mission for some time. ABMA's Project Horizon proposed using fifteen Saturn launches to carry up spacecraft components and fuel that would be assembled in orbit to build a single very large lunar craft. This Earth orbit rendezvous mission profile required the least amount of booster capacity per launch, and was thus able to be carried out using the existing rocket design. This would be the first step towards a small crewed base on the moon, which would require several additional Saturn launches every month to supply it.

The Air Force had also started their Lunex Project in 1958, also with a goal of building a crewed lunar outpost. Like NASA, Lunex favored the direct ascent mode, and therefore required much larger boosters. As part of the project, they designed an entirely new rocket series known as the Space Launcher System, or SLS (not to be confused with the Space Launch System part of the Artemis program), which combined a number of solid-fuel boosters with either the Titan missile or a new custom booster stage to address a wide variety of launch weights. The smallest SLS vehicle consisted of a Titan and two strap-on solids, giving it performance similar to Titan C, allowing it to act as a launcher for Dyna-Soar. The largest used much larger solid-rockets and a much-enlarged booster for their direct ascent mission. Combinations in-between these extremes would be used for other satellite launching duties.

=== Silverstein Committee ===
A government commission, the "Saturn Vehicle Evaluation Committee" (better known as the Silverstein Committee), was assembled to recommend specific directions that NASA could take with the existing Army program. The committee recommended the development of new, hydrogen-burning upper stages for the Saturn, and outlined eight different configurations for heavy-lift boosters ranging from very low-risk solutions making heavy use of existing technology, to designs that relied on hardware that had not been developed yet, including the proposed new upper stage. The configurations were:

==== Saturn A ====
- A-1 – Saturn lower stage, Titan second stage, and Centaur third stage (von Braun's original concept).
- A-2 – Saturn lower stage, proposed clustered Jupiter second stage, and Centaur third stage.
Saturn A variants

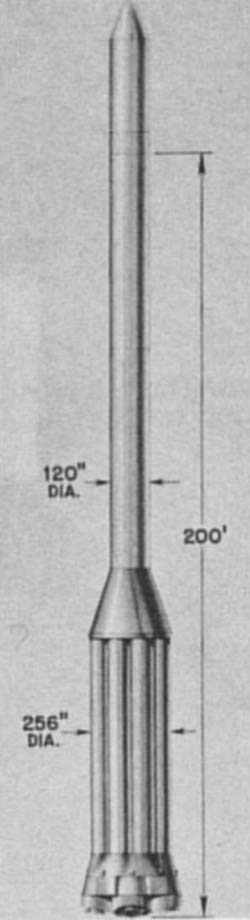
Saturn A-1

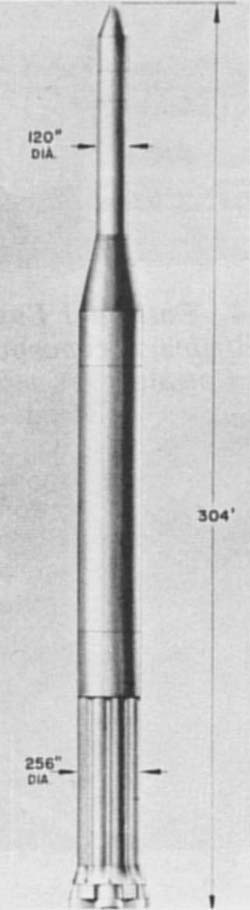
Saturn A-2

==== Saturn B ====
- B-1 – Saturn lower stage, proposed clustered Titan second stage, proposed S-IV third stage and Centaur fourth stage.

==== Saturn C ====
- C-1 – Saturn lower stage, proposed S-IV second stage (similar to the actual Saturn I).
- C-2 – Saturn lower stage, proposed S-II second stage, proposed S-IV third stage.
- C-3, C-4, C-5 and C-8 – all based on different variations of a new lower stage using F-1 engines, variations of proposed S-II second stages, and proposed S-IV third stages (with C-5 being similar to the actual Saturn V).
Saturn C variants

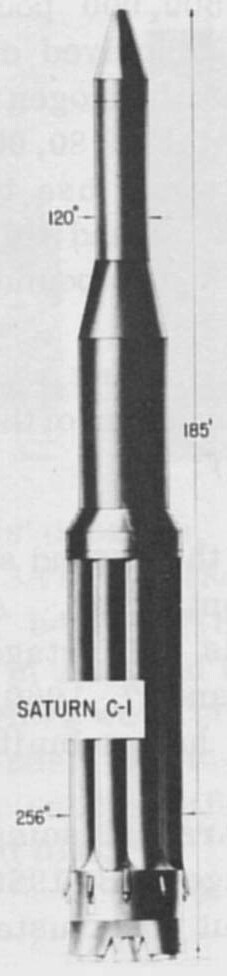
Saturn C-1

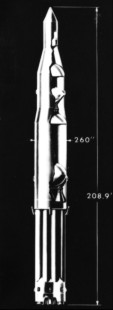
Saturn C-2

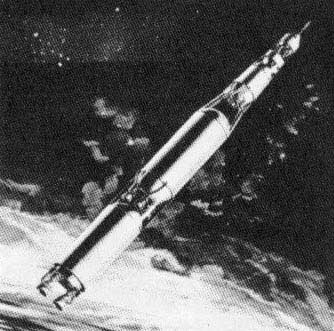
Saturn C-3

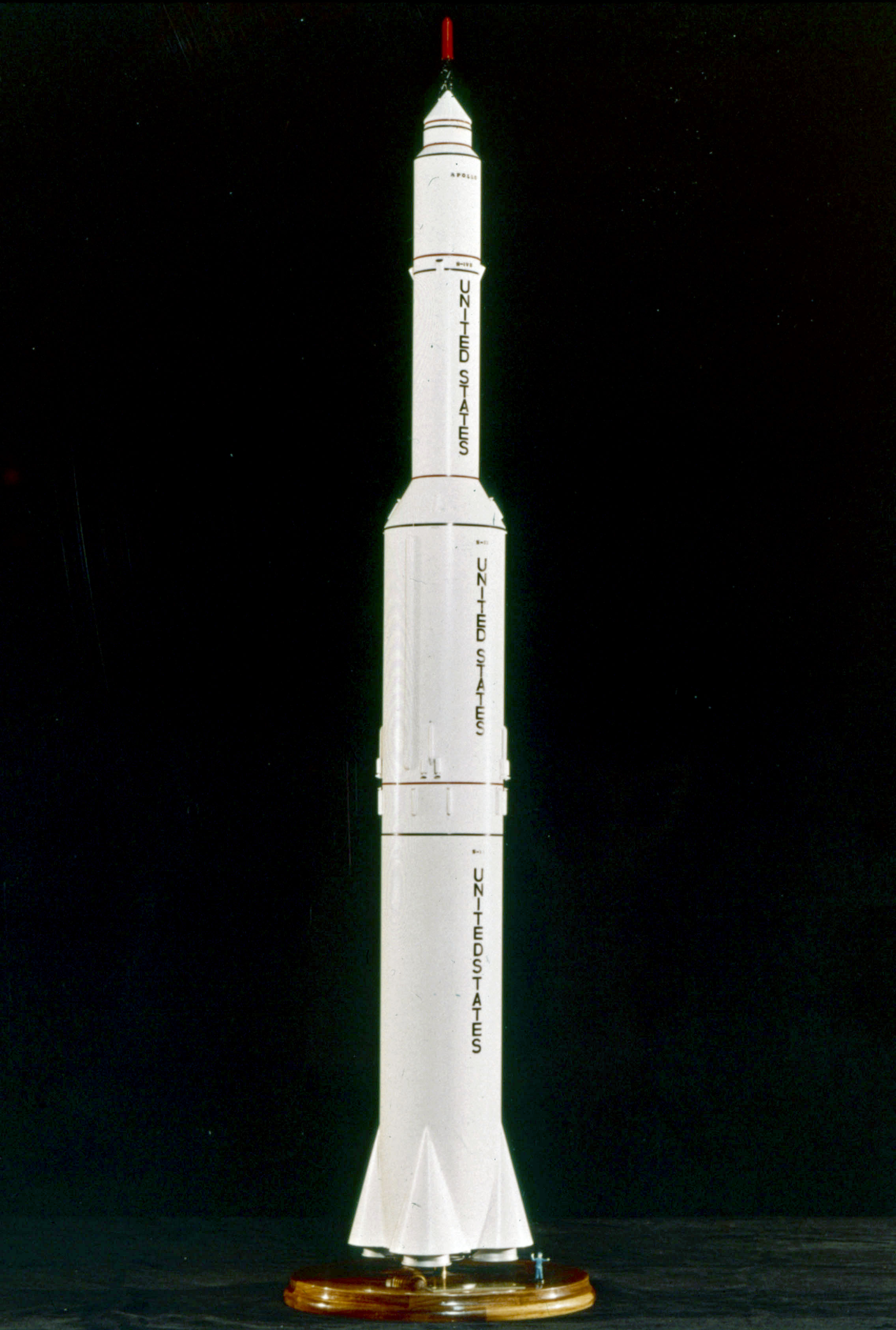
Saturn C-4

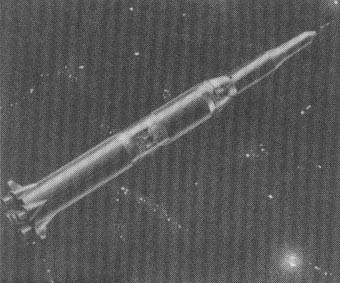
Saturn C-5

Contracts for the development of a new hydrogen-burning engine were given to Rocketdyne in 1960 and for the development of the Saturn IV stage to Douglas the same year.

=== Launch history ===
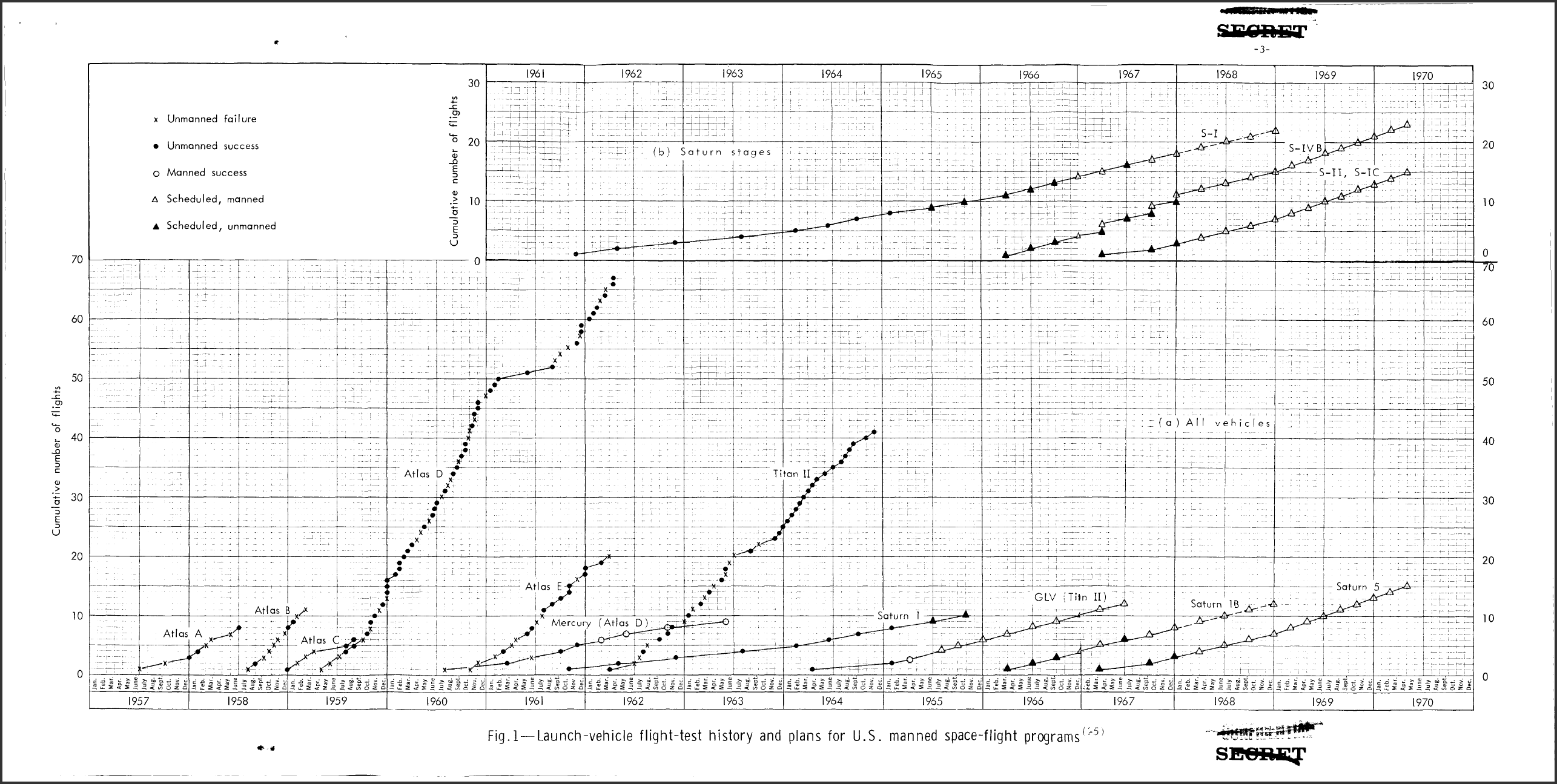
1965 graph showing cumulative history and projection of Saturn launches by month (along with Atlas and Titan)

Saturn Launch History
Program	Vehicle	Mission	Launch Date	Pad
Saturn I	SA-1	SA-1	Oct 27, 1961	34
Saturn I	SA-2	SA-2	Apr 25, 1962	34
Saturn I	SA-3	SA-3	Nov 16, 1962	34
Saturn I	SA-4	SA-4	Mar 28, 1963	34
Saturn I	SA-5	SA-5	Jan 29, 1964	37B
Saturn I	SA-6	A-101	May 28, 1964	37B
Saturn I	SA-7	A-102	Sep 18, 1964	37B
Saturn I	SA-9	A-103	Feb 16, 1965	37B
Saturn I	SA-8	A-104	May 25, 1965	37B
Saturn I	SA-10	A-105	Jul 30, 1965	37B
Saturn IB	SA-201	AS-201	Feb 26, 1966	34
Saturn IB	SA-203	AS-203	Jul 5, 1966	37B
Saturn IB	SA-202	AS-202	Aug 25, 1966	34
Saturn V	SA-501	Apollo 4	Nov 9, 1967	39A
Saturn IB	SA-204	Apollo 5	Jan 22, 1968	37B
Saturn V	SA-502	Apollo 6	Apr 4, 1968	39A
Saturn IB	SA-205	Apollo 7	Oct 11, 1968	34
Saturn V	SA-503	Apollo 8	Dec 21, 1968	39A
Saturn V	SA-504	Apollo 9	Mar 3, 1969	39A
Saturn V	SA-505	Apollo 10	May 18, 1969	39B
Saturn V	SA-506	Apollo 11	Jul 16, 1969	39A
Saturn V	SA-507	Apollo 12	Nov 14, 1969	39A
Saturn V	SA-508	Apollo 13	Apr 11, 1970	39A
Saturn V	SA-509	Apollo 14	Jan 31, 1971	39A
Saturn V	SA-510	Apollo 15	Jul 26, 1971	39A
Saturn V	SA-511	Apollo 16	Apr 16, 1972	39A
Saturn V	SA-512	Apollo 17	Dec 7, 1972	39A
Saturn V	SA-513	Skylab 1	May 14, 1973	39A
Saturn IB	SA-206	Skylab 2	May 25, 1973	39B
Saturn IB	SA-207	Skylab 3	Jul 28, 1973	39B
Saturn IB	SA-208	Skylab 4	Nov 16, 1973	39B
Saturn IB	SA-210	ASTP	Jul 15, 1975	39B

== Apollo program ==
"The Saturn IB Story 1966" - Official NASA promotional information film reel.

The challenge that President John F. Kennedy put to NASA in May 1961 to put an astronaut on the Moon by the end of the decade put a sudden new urgency on the Saturn program. That year saw a flurry of activity as different means of reaching the Moon were evaluated.

Both the Nova and Saturn rockets, which shared a similar design and could share some parts, were evaluated for the mission. However, it was judged that the Saturn would be easier to get into production, since many of the components were designed to be air-transportable. Nova would require new factories for all the major stages, and there were serious concerns that they could not be completed in time. Saturn required only one new factory, for the largest of the proposed lower stages, and was selected primarily for that reason.

The Saturn C-5 (later given the name Saturn V), the most powerful of the Silverstein Committee's configurations, was selected as the most suitable design. At the time the mission mode had not been selected, so they chose the most powerful booster design in order to ensure that there would be ample power. Selection of the lunar orbit rendezvous method reduced the launch weight requirements below those of the Nova, into the C-5's range.

At this point, however, all three stages existed only on paper, and it was realized that it was very likely that the actual lunar spacecraft would be developed and ready for testing long before the booster. NASA, therefore, decided to also continue development of the C-1 (later Saturn I) as a test vehicle, since its lower stage was based on existing technology (Redstone and Jupiter tankage) and its upper stage was already in development. This would provide valuable testing for the S-IV as well as a launch platform for capsules and other components in low earth orbit.

The members of the Saturn family that were actually built were:

- Saturn I – ten rockets flew: five development flights, and five launches of boilerplate Apollo spacecraft and Pegasus micrometeoroid satellites.
- Saturn IB – nine launches; a refined version of the Saturn I with a more powerful first stage (designated the S-IB) and using the Saturn V's S-IVB as a second stage. These carried the first Apollo flight crew, plus three Skylab and one Apollo-Soyuz crews, into Earth orbit.
- Saturn V – 13 launches; the Moon rocket that sent Apollo astronauts to the Moon, and carried the Skylab space station into orbit.
Built members of the Saturn family

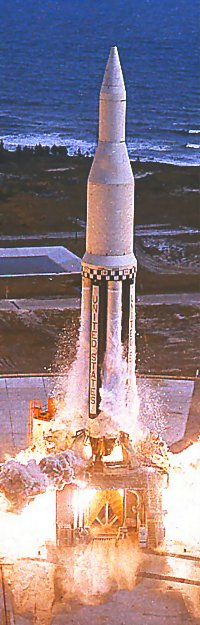
A Saturn I (SA-1) liftoff from LC-34

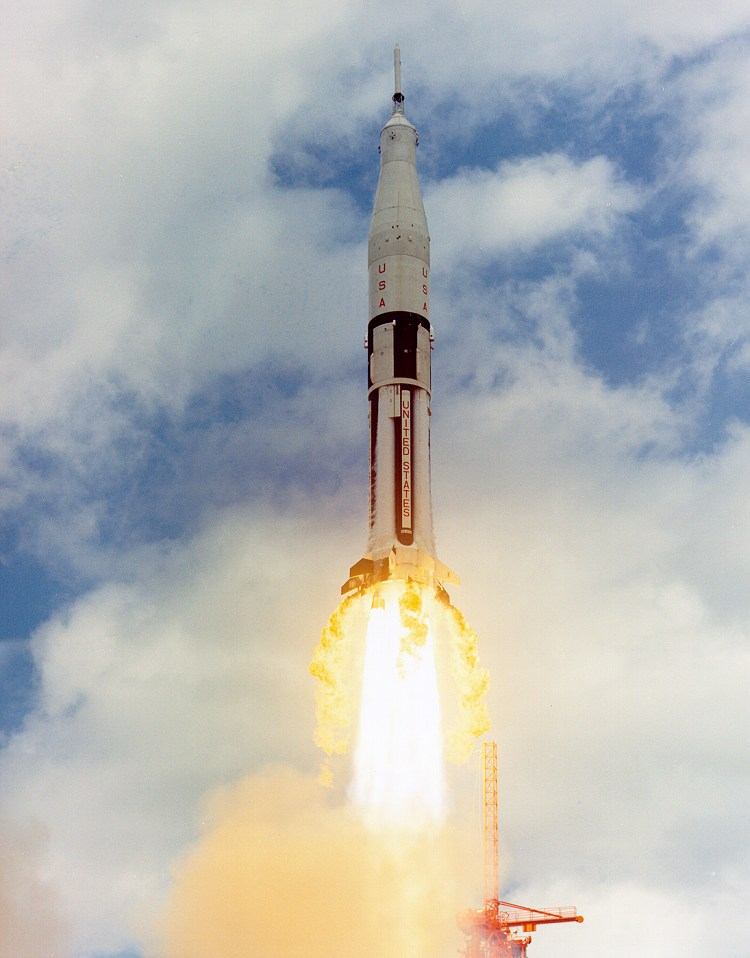
A Saturn IB (AS-202) liftoff from LC-34

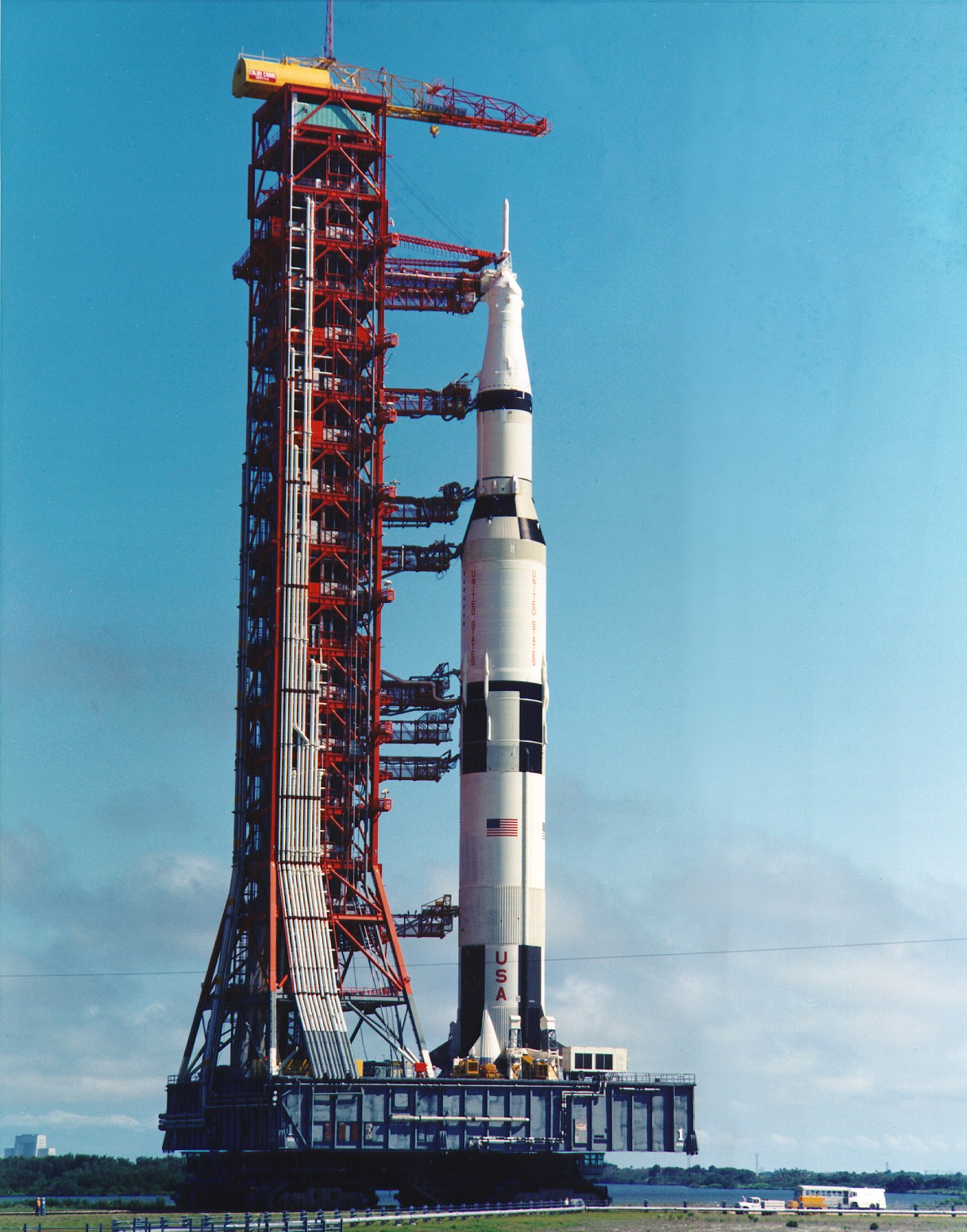
A Saturn V (Apollo 11) being Rolled out to the launch pad

== Variants ==
The following table lists flown and proposed Saturn family vehicles and associates stages:

Year	Saturn version	Type	Payload (LEO)	Booster	Stage 1		Stage 2		Stage 3		Stage 4	
Year	Saturn version	Type	Payload (LEO)	Booster	Name	Engine	Name	Engine	Name	Engine	Name	Engine
1962	IB	Flown	21,000 kg		S-IB	H-1 x8	S-IVB-200	J-2 x1				
1959	A-1	Proposed	13,600 kg		S-I	H-1 x8	Titan I	LR-87-3 x2	Centaur C	RL-10A-1 x2		
1959	A-2	Proposed	10,000 kg		S-I	H-1 x8	clustered Jupiter	LR-79 x4	Centaur C	RL-10A-1 x2		
1959	B-1	Proposed	13,000 kg		S-IB-2	F-1 x2	clustered Titan	LR-79 x4	S-IV	RL-10 x6	Centaur C	RL-10A-1 x2
1959	C-1 / I	Flown	9,100 kg		S-I	H-1 x8	S-IV	RL-10 x6	S-V	RL-10 x2		
1960	C-2	Proposed	21,500 kg		S-I	H-1 x8	S-II	J-2 x4	S-IV	RL-10 x6	S-V	RL-10 x2
1961	C-3	Proposed	45,000 kg		S-IB-2	F-1 x2	S-II-C3	J-2 x4	S-IV	RL-10 x6		
1966	INT-20	Proposed	60,500 kg		S-IC	F-1 x4	S-IVB	J-2 x1				
1960	C-4	Proposed	99,000 kg		S-IB-4	F-1 x4	S-II-4	J-2 x4	S-IVB	J-2 x1		
1962	C-5 / V	Flown	140,000 kg		S-IC	F-1 x5	S-II	J-2 x5	S-IVB	J-2 x1		
1965	C-5N	Proposed	155,000 kg		S-IC	F-1 x5	S-II	J-2 x5	Nuclear			
1962	C-8	Proposed	210,000 kg		S-IC-8	F-1 x8	S-II-8	J-2 x8	S-IVB	J-2 x1		
1965	IB-CE	Proposed	22,000 kg		S-IB	H-1 x8	S-IVB-200	J-2 x1	Centaur D/E			
1965	IB-A	Proposed	18,600 kg		S-IB-A	upgraded H-1 x8	streched S-IVB-200	J-2 x1	Centaur D/E			
1965	IB-B	Proposed	22,700 kg		S-IB-A	upgraded H-1 x8	MS-IVB-2	HG-3				
1965	IB-C	Proposed	20,400 kg	Minuteman x4	S-IB	H-1 x8	S-IVB-200	J-2 x1				
1965	IB-D	Proposed	33,000 kg	UA1205 x4	S-IB	H-1 x8	S-IVB-200	J-2 x1				
1965	INT-05	Proposed	27,200 kg		INT-05	260'' solid	S-IVB	J-2 x1				
1966	INT-11	Proposed	48,000 kg	UA1207 x4	S-IB-11	H-1b x8	S-IVB	J-2 x1				
1966	INT-12	Proposed	34,000 kg	UA1205 x4	S-1B-4 H-1	H-1b x4	S-IVB	J-2 x1				
1966	INT-13	Proposed	36,590 kg	UA1207 x2	S-IB-11	H-1b x8	S-IVB	J-2 x1				
1966	INT-14	Proposed	23,180 kg	Minuteman x4	S-IB-11	H-1b x8	S-IVB	J-2 x1				
1966	INT-15	Proposed	26,000 kg	Minuteman x8	S-IB-15	H-1b x8	S-IVB	J-2 x1				
1966	INT-16	Proposed	28,000 kg	UA1205 x5	S-IVB	J-2 x1						
1966	INT-17	Proposed	42,000 kg		S-II–INT-17	HG-3-SL x7	S-IVB-200					
1966	INT-18	Proposed	66,000 kg	UA1204/5/7; x2 or 4	S-II	J-2 x5	S-IVB-200 (optional)					
1966	INT-19	Proposed	34,200 kg	Minuteman, x4 to 12	S-II	J-2-SL x5	S-IVB-200					
1967	INT-20	Proposed	60,500 kg		S-IC	F-1 x3 to 5	S-IVB	J-2 x1				
1967	INT-21	Proposed	115,900 kg		S-IC	F-1 x5	S-II	J-2 x5				
	INT-23	Proposed										
	INT-24	Proposed										
	INT-25	Proposed										
1965	INT-27	Proposed										
1967	LCB	Proposed										
1965	Saturn V-3	Proposed	160,400 kg		MS-IC-1	F-1A x5	MS-II-2	HG-3 x5				
