= Samuel Kurtz Hoffman =

American engineer

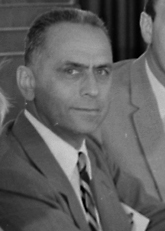
- Hoffman in 1958
- Born: 15 April 1902
- Died: 26 June 1995 (aged 93)
- Education: Pennsylvania State University
- Known for: Rocket Propulsion

Samuel Kurtz Hoffman (15 April 1902 – 26 June 1995) was an American engineer who specialised in rocket propulsion.

He served as chief engineer at engine manufacturing firm Lycoming Engines and later became professor of aerospace engineering at Pennsylvania State University, his alma mater.

While leading a team at North American Aviation (which later became Rocketdyne) between 1949 and 1970 he developed the F-1 engines that would power the Saturn V rocket, and later worked on the Space Shuttle Main Engine.
