= Saturn IB-A =

Proposed rocket model

- Function: Orbital launch vehicle
- Manufacturer: Douglas Aircraft Company
- Country of origin: United States

Size
- Height: 62 m (203 ft)
- Diameter: 6.61 m (21.7 ft)
- Mass: 605,980 kg (1,335,960 lb)
- Stages: 3

Capacity

Payload to LEO
- Altitude: 185 km (115 mi)
- Orbital inclination: 28
- Mass: 18,600 kg (41,000 lb)

Associated rockets
- Family: Saturn
- Based on: Saturn IB

Launch history
- Status: Concept/study
- Total launches: 0

The Saturn IB-A was a proposed Saturn I family variant studied by the Douglas Aircraft Company but never built. It was to be a three-stage rocket virtually identical in layout to the Saturn IB-CE, with upgraded H-1 engines and a stretched S-IVB stage.
