= SM-65C Atlas =

Missile

Atlas C (SM-65C)
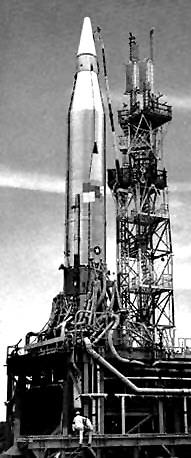
- Atlas C awaiting launch (USAF)
- Function: Prototype ICBM
- Manufacturer: Convair
- Country of origin: United States

Launch history
- Status: Retired
- Launch sites: LC-12, CCAFS
- Total launches: 6
- Success(es): 3
- Failure(s): 3
- First flight: 24 December 1958
- Last flight: 24 August 1959

Boosters
- No. boosters: 1
- Powered by: 2 XLR-89-5
- Total thrust: 341,130 lbf (1,517.4 kN)
- Specific impulse: 282 s
- Burn time: 135 s
- Propellant: RP-1/LOX

First stage
- Powered by: 1 XLR-105-5
- Maximum thrust: 81,655 lbf (363.22 kN)
- Specific impulse: 309 s
- Burn time: 240 s
- Propellant: RP-1/LOX

The SM-65C Atlas, or Atlas C was a prototype of the Atlas missile. First flown on 24 December 1958, the Atlas C was the final development version of the Atlas rocket, prior to the operational Atlas D. It was originally planned to be used as the first stage of the Atlas-Able rocket, but following an explosion during a static test on 24 September 1959, this was abandoned in favor of the Atlas D. Atlas C was similar to Atlas B, but had a larger LOX tank and smaller RP-1 tank due to technical changes to the Rocketdyne engines. Improvements in materials and manufacturing processes also resulted in lighter-weight components than the Atlas A and B. Booster burn time was much longer than the A/B series, up to 151 seconds. All launches took place from LC-12 at CCAS.

== Test history ==
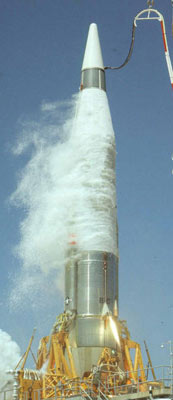
Atlas 8C, 21 July 1959

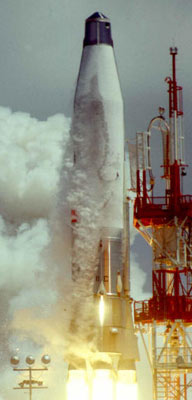
Atlas 11C, 24 August 1959

The Atlas C test program began with the successful flight of 3C on December 23, 1958. All systems performed well and the extended booster burn time was carried out with no ill effects. On January 27, Missile 4C experienced a complete Mod III GE guidance system failure at T+80 seconds. The propellant utilization system operated fuel rich, resulting in low sustainer thrust following BECO, and LOX depletion caused simultaneous sustainer/vernier cutoff 5 seconds earlier than the planned SECO. In addition, a malfunction of the pneumatic system caused decay of fuel tank pressure starting at T+120 seconds. Tank pressure remained high enough to maintain structural integrity through powered flight, the intermediate bulkhead possibly ruptured at T+320 seconds, at which point tank pressures had dropped below a safe limit. Because of the guidance system failure, no separation signal was received by the reentry vehicle. Impact occurred about 40 miles short of the target point in the South Atlantic.

Missile 5C (February 20) performed well until BECO, at which point the fuel staging disconnect valve failed, causing a gradual fuel leak and decay in tank pressures. When propellant levels in the tank dropped low enough, the open staging disconnect valve allowed helium pressure gas to escape, causing a more rapid pressure loss. At approximately T+168 seconds, the intermediate bulkhead reversed, followed by explosion of the missile at T+172 seconds.

Missile 7C (March 19) suffered a guidance system failure at T+85 seconds, followed by premature BECO at T+129 seconds. A backup command from the missile programmer jettisoned the booster section at T+151 seconds. After the premature booster cutoff, the missile became unstable because it was impossible for the autopilot to gimbal the sustainer engine with the booster section still attached. Missile stability was partially regained after booster jettison, then completely lost after SECO. No cutoff command was issued to the sustainer or verniers because of the guidance system failure, sustainer cutoff occurred at T+282 seconds, but the exact reason for it was not determined. During the vernier solo phase, the missile started tumbling. VECO took place at T+311 seconds when the vernier start tanks became depleted. Reentry vehicle separation also did not occur.

The final two C-series flights (8C on July 21 and 11C on August 24) were successful. Missile 8C was the third attempt to fly an RVX-2 reentry vehicle (the second attempt on a D-series Atlas had failed three months earlier) and the first successful one. All missile systems performed well aside from high thrust section temperatures starting at T+85 seconds. Sixty-three minutes after launch, the RV was successfully recovered. Missile 11C carried a movie camera in the nose cone which filmed missile separation and a large portion of the Earth's surface on a 250-mile (402 km) lob, taking it to an apogee of 700 miles (1126 km). Recovery of the film capsule was successful. Overall performance of 11C was quite good, the sustainer HS valve malfunctioned and resulted in reduced LOX flow to the engine, this resulted in low sustainer thrust and complete fuel depletion by SECO, and it was suspected that a leak in a LOX duct had affected the HS valve. The high thrust section temperatures on 8C also recurred, in addition tracking film showed debris falling off the missile between T+46 and 54 seconds, the debris was not identified and did not appear to have any adverse effect on vehicle performance.

One of the more significant upgrades to the Atlas C was the addition of motion detectors in the gyroscope package to ensure proper operation. This was implemented after the first B-series Atlas had failed in flight due to launch crews neglecting to power on the gyroscopes and would soon become a standard part of all ballistic missile guidance systems.

Missile 9C was designated for the first Atlas-Able lunar probe launch, which was scheduled to launch on October 2, 1959 from LC-12 at Cape Canaveral.

The Atlas C was still an R&D vehicle and NASA wanted instead to use the operational D-series Atlas for space launches, but there were none available and they had to instead settle for a modified C-series. Atlas 9C was assigned to the Pioneer-Able program and received several modifications for the mission, including deletion of vernier solo mode, autopilot modifications for the longer vehicle length, and the LOX boil-off valve being moved slightly to accommodate the Able adapter.

Atlas 9C was delivered to CCAS on April 5, 1959 with the intention of a June 6 launch date. However, the launch was postponed due to repeated technical problems and the vehicle put in storage to free up LC-12 for Missiles 8C and 11C. The postflight findings from Atlas 5C necessitated modifications to the fuel staging disconnect valve; these were performed in late July. On August 27, Atlas 9C was erected on LC-12. The Able second stage was stacked on top with a dummy third stage.

At 10:12 AM EST on September 24, the PFRF test for 9C was initiated. Following a normal engine start, a fire erupted in the thrust section. After 2.5 seconds of engine operation, an automatic cutoff command was issued to the propulsion system. A LOX-fed fire quickly burned out of control and was too intense for pad fire extinguishing facilities to handle. About 37 seconds after the test began, the Atlas began to lean over and fall towards the umbilical tower, exploding in a gigantic fireball that completely leveled LC-12. Both umbilical towers and the service tower were knocked over, a one-ton piece of the latter being thrown 500 feet from the pad, and the concrete launch stand caved in. The pad was put out of use for the next six months.

Investigators concluded that the disaster was due to the above-mentioned configuration change on the Atlas C, in addition to several weight-saving modifications unique to Missile 9C. When the Atlas was assembled at Convair, workmen attached a helium vent line to a port near the bottom of the RP-1 tank, below the anti-slosh baffles. On the Atlas B missiles, the vernier helium tank was mounted in a higher location resulting in a different fuel tank attachment point above the baffles. Helium pressure gas from the vernier propellant tanks leaked into the sustainer RP-1 turbopump, leading to cavitation which caused propellant unloading, pump overspeed, and rupture of low pressure LOX ducting. This then caused the fire that led to vehicle destruction. The reason for the LOX ducting rupturing was not clear, but likely the sudden pressure change from the engine shutdown or the sustainer turbopump blades rubbing against the pump casing. The accident was ultimately ruled to be the result of poor engineering judgement in attaching the vernier helium vent line to the bottom of the RP-1 tank. This was not the first occurrence of the failure mode; Missile 6C had exploded on the test stand at Sycamore Canyon the previous March due to the vernier start tanks being connected incorrectly.

Examination of recovered missile parts found major damage in the sustainer hardware; the turbopump overspeed had caused the blades to rub against the pump casing, evidenced by the damaged condition of the blades and the presence of slag fragments. The sustainer gas generator had suffered a LOX-rich shutdown and had extensive heat damage; the turbine blades were melted away. The booster engine hardware had considerable fire and impact damage but these were secondary effects of the failure and telemetry data showed normal booster operation until cutoff. Some missile components such as the V1 vernier and most of the sustainer fuel start system remained missing and unaccounted for. Final explosion of the missile was believed to be loss of tank pressure resulting in collapse of the intermediate bulkhead and all of the LOX and RP-1 mixing and turning to gel, which then exploded with the force of 20,000 pounds of TNT. The missile cutoff had caused the LOX valves to snap shut, resulting in overpressurization of the LOX tank. The pneumatic system threw open the LOX boil-off valve to equalize the pressure, but eventually resulted in pressures too low to maintain structural integrity. Ground crews attempted to flip switches to raise the LOX tank pressure and lower the fuel tank pressure but nothing happened, possibly due to fire-induced damage to the control wiring. A large quantity of RP-1 spilled into the flame bucket at cutoff and started a fire.

Six flights were made. These were all sub-orbital test flights of the Atlas as an Intercontinental Ballistic Missile, with three tests succeeding, and three failing.

All Atlas C launches were conducted from Cape Canaveral Air Force Station, at Launch Complex 12.

== Launch history ==
Date	Time (GMT)	Serial	Apogee	Outcome	Remarks
1958-12-24	04:45	3C	900 km (560 mi)	Success	
1959-01-27	23:34	4C	900 km (560 mi)	Partial failure	Guidance system failed, however the flight control system managed to keep the missile on a stable path and impact was close to the target point.
1959-02-20	05:38	5C	100 km (62 mi)	Failure	Valve malfunction during staging led to loss of tank pressure and reversal of the intermediate bulkhead. The missile destroyed itself at T+174 seconds.
1959-03-19	00:59	7C	200 km (120 mi)	Partial failure	Premature booster engine shutdown due to an electrical malfunction at T+131 seconds led to an unstable flight trajectory.
1959-07-21	05:22	8C	900 km (560 mi)	Success	
1959-08-24	15:53	11C	900 km (560 mi)	Success	

== See also ==
- SM-65 Atlas
- Able (rocket stage)
