= Rocketdyne E-1 =

Liquid propellant rocket engine

Rocketdyne's E-1 was a liquid propellant rocket engine originally built as a backup design for the Titan I missile. While it was being developed, Heinz-Hermann Koelle at the Army Ballistic Missile Agency (ABMA) selected it as the primary engine for the rocket that would emerge as the Saturn I. In the end, the Titan went ahead with its primary engine, and the Saturn team decided to use the lower-thrust H-1 in order to speed development. The E-1 project was cancelled in 1959, but Rocketdyne's success with the design gave NASA confidence in Rocketdyne's ability to deliver the much larger F-1, which powered the first stage of the Saturn V missions to the Moon.

== History ==
=== Genesis ===
In July 1954 the Air Force Scientific Advisory Board's ICBM working group advised the Western Development Division (WDD) on their doubts about the Atlas missile that was then under development. Atlas used a number of unconventional features in order to meet its performance goals, and they felt that there was undue risk that if any of these proved unworkable in practice then the entire design would fail. The group suggested that a second ICBM project be started as a risk mitigation effort.

SAC's concerns were taken to heart within the Air Force, and they directed Ramo-Wooldridge to study the issue. Ramo responded by inviting Lockheed and the Glenn L. Martin Company to propose alternative ICBM designs. Based on these reports, Ramo suggested that the Air Force begin development of a new missile that used a conventional airframe in place of the Atlas's "balloon tanks", and replaced the "stage and a half" layout with a two-stage design.

=== Titan ===
Selecting from the two proposals, a contract was awarded to Martin for what emerged as the Titan. Aerojet General was selected to build the engines for the design, developing the two-chamber LR-87 on the booster and the single LR-91 on the upper stage. In keeping with the low-risk development concept underpinning the entire Titan project, WDD also selected North American Aviation's Rocketdyne Division to develop a backup engine.

Rocketdyne, which was spun off as a separate company in 1955, decided to meet the needs for the c. 350,000 lbf (1,600 kN) thrust requirements with a single engine, as opposed to a cluster of smaller engines. Starting with the basic layout from their successful MB-3/S-3 (known to the Air Force as the LR79) from the Thor and Jupiter missiles, Rocketdyne developed the E-1 by expanding its size and tuning the engine bell for operation at lower altitudes. At higher altitudes the upper stage would be firing.

Development of the E-1 was rapid and prototypes were sent to the Santa Susana Field Laboratory later in 1955. However, development of a stable fuel injector proved difficult, and took 18 months to fully solve. Over a series of months the thrust was increased until it developed over 379,837 lbf (1,689 kN) at sea level. A complete booster stage equipped with the E-1 was fired on 10 January 1956.

=== Saturn ===
In April 1957 Wernher von Braun tasked Heinz-Hermann Koelle with the development of a space launch system to meet new requirements specified by the then-unofficial ARPA. Koelle concluded that in order to meet their payload requirements, 10,000 to 20,000 lb (9,100 kg) into low Earth orbit, a booster stage with 1 million pounds of thrust would be needed.

Looking for an engine able to develop these sorts of power levels, he learned about the E-1 from Rocketdyne's George Sutton. The E-1 was, by far, the most powerful engine that could be available in the time frame that ARPA was demanding. Koelle selected a cluster of four E-1's as the basis of a new booster they called the "Juno V". "Juno" was the blanket name the team used to refer to launchers, although previous examples had all been adapted from missiles.

To speed development of Juno V, the engines were attached to a single thrust plate, and supplied propellant from a cluster of tanks taken from the existing Jupiter and Redstone missile airframes. The design was jokingly referred to as "cluster's last stand". Later that year the team started referring to the design as the "Saturn", for "the one after Jupiter", Jupiter being ABMA's latest successful rocket design. The name stuck and became official in early 1959.

After the launch of Sputnik on 4 October 1957, the U.S. was in a panic over how to quickly catch up with the Soviets in what appeared to be a "Space Race". One idea quickly gained currency – the formation of a civilian space agency that would evolve into NASA. The Army had already lost interest in the development of the Saturn due to a lack of mission requirements, and had agreed to turn over the ABMA team to NASA on 1 July 1960.

In July 1958 von Braun was visited by Dick Canright and Bob Young of ARPA, who informed von Braun they still had $10 million left in their budget to spend before ABMA was turned over to NASA. von Braun called in Koelle, who presented a 1/10 scale model of the Juno V, still equipped with the E-1 engine. Canright and Young noted that the engine wouldn't be ready in time for the handoff, and asked if the rocket could be built with an existing engine instead. Koelle suggested that eight engines from the existing S-3D series could be used in place of the E-1, and everyone approved.

Development of the Saturn moved ahead with a slightly upgraded version of the S-3D, known as the H-1. When NASA started the process of taking over ABMA, they decided that the project was worthwhile, and continued funding its development.

=== Cancellation ===
When Aerojet successfully demonstrated the LR-87, the Titan moved ahead with this engine and the first production example was delivered to the Air Force in 1958. Koelle considered continuing funding development of the E-1 from his budget but decided against it. As von Braun later noted, the development costs were too high for what would have given them a small performance boost, especially since a single F-1 could replace all of the E-1s for an even greater advantage. Rocketdyne requested that the Air Force drop their interest in the E-1, which they did, and development of the engine ended.

== Description ==
The E-1 was a single-chamber liquid fuel engine burning RP-1 (refined kerosene similar to jet fuel) and liquid oxygen. Turbopumps were powered by a gas generator. Thrust was c. 380,000 lbf (1,700 kN) at sea level, rising to c. 425,000 lbf (1,890 kN) in vacuum, corresponding to a rise in specific impulse from 260 seconds to 290. The entire combustion chamber and engine bell were regeneratively cooled using a system similar to the S-3 and later F-1.
