= Saturn IB-D =

1965 US heavy-lift orbital launcher proposal

- Function: Uncrewed LEO and Lunar launch vehicle
- Manufacturer: Von Braun
- Country of origin: United States

Size
- Height: 51.00 m (167.32 ft)
- Diameter: 6.61 m (21.7 ft)
- Mass: 1,511,980 kg (3,333,350 lb)
- Stages: 2

Capacity

Payload to LEO
- Mass: 33,000 kg (73,000 lb)

Launch history
- Status: Concept/study
- Launch sites: N/A
- Total launches: N/A

Boosters – Titan UA1205
- No. boosters: 4
- Powered by: 1 United Technologies UA1205
- Maximum thrust: 5,849.411 kN (1,315,000 lb_{f})
- Specific impulse: 263 s (2.58 km/s)
- Burn time: 115 seconds
- Propellant: PBAN

First stage – S-1B
- Powered by: 8 Rocketdyne H-1
- Maximum thrust: 8,241.763 kN (1,852,822 lb_{f})
- Specific impulse: 296 s (2.90 km/s)
- Burn time: 155 seconds
- Propellant: RP-1/LOX

Second stage – S-IVB
- Powered by: 1 Rocketdyne J-2
- Maximum thrust: 1,031.600 kN (231,913 lb_{f})
- Specific impulse: 421 s (4.13 km/s)
- Burn time: 475 seconds
- Propellant: LH2/LOX

The Saturn IB-D was a heavy-lift launch vehicle concept studied by Douglas Aircraft Company in 1965 consisting of a whole Saturn IB with 4 strap-on UA1205 SRBs that have flown on the Titan 3E interplanetary missile carriers. All components of the vehicle have flown, but not together for this concept.
