= Saturn B-1 =

1959 four-stage rocket concept

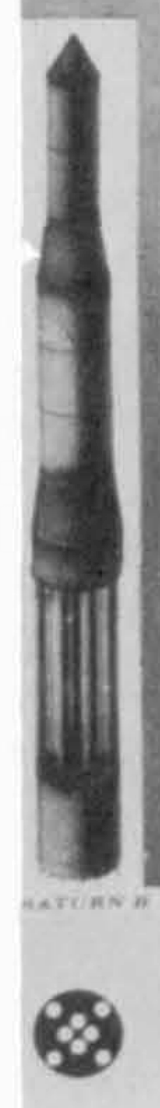
- Manufacturer: Von Braun
- Country of origin: United States

Size
- Height: 74 m (242.00 ft)
- Diameter: 6.52 m (21.39 ft)
- Mass: 680,420 kg
- Stages: 4 (all used on various vehicles, now retired)

Capacity
- Payload to LEO: 13,000 kg

Launch history
- Status: Never flown
- Launch sites: N/A

First stage - S-IB
- Engines: 8 × Rocketdyne H-1b
- Thrust: 1,852,822 lbf (8,241.76 kN)
- Burn time: 155 seconds
- Propellant: RP-1/LOX

Second stage Titan Cluster
- Engines: 4 LR-89-5
- Thrust: 2940.000 kN
- Burn time: 137 seconds
- Propellant: RP-1/LOX

Third stage - S-IV
- Engines: 6 RL10
- Thrust: 400.346 kN
- Burn time: 482 seconds
- Propellant: LH_{2}/LOX

Fourth stage - Centaur C
- Engines: 2 RL10A-1
- Thrust: 133.448 kN
- Burn time: 430 sec
- Propellant: LH_{2}/LOX

Studied in 1959, the Saturn B-1 was a four-stage concept rocket similar to the Jupiter-C, and consisted of a Saturn IB first stage (powered by eight Rocketdyne H1-b engines), a cluster of four Titan I first stages used for a second stage (equivalent to four LR-89-5 engines), a S-IV third stage (with six RL10 engines) and a Centaur high-energy liquid-fueled fourth stage (with two RL10A-1 engines).

Like its proposed predecessors, the Saturn B-1 never flew and neither did the Titan cluster stage. The S-IV stage however flew on the Saturn I.

== See also ==
- List of space launch system designs
