= Saturn IB-C =

Launch vehicle concept

- Function: Orbital launch vehicle
- Manufacturer: Douglas Aircraft Company
- Country of origin: United States

Size
- Height: 51m
- Diameter: 6.61m
- Stages: 3

Capacity
- Payload to LEO: 20400 kg

Associated rockets
- Based on: Saturn IB

Launch history
- Status: Concept/study
- Total launches: 0

The Saturn IB-C was a orbital launch vehicle concept studied in 1965. The booster would consist of an ordinary Saturn IB with four Minuteman first stages used as strap-on boosters. The Saturn IB core booster did fly from 1966 until 1975, but never with any strap-on boosters.
