= Saturn IB-CE =

The Saturn IB-CE rocket was a variant of the Saturn IB rocket studied in 1965 by Douglas. However unlike the Saturn IB the Saturn IB-CE was to be a three-stage rocket. The IB-CE used the same configuration as the Saturn IB for the first two stages however with the addition of a Centaur D/E rocket as the third stage. It was to be capable of delivering 22,000 kg to low Earth orbit and 5,590 kg into a translunar trajectory.

Although this version never flew, a similar rocket, the Titan IIIE, built primarily for the U.S. Air Force, but launching a few NASA payloads, including the Viking and Voyager spacecraft, had the same equivalent thrust as the Saturn IB-CE.
