= List of Apollo missions =

Missions and flights of NASA's Apollo Program

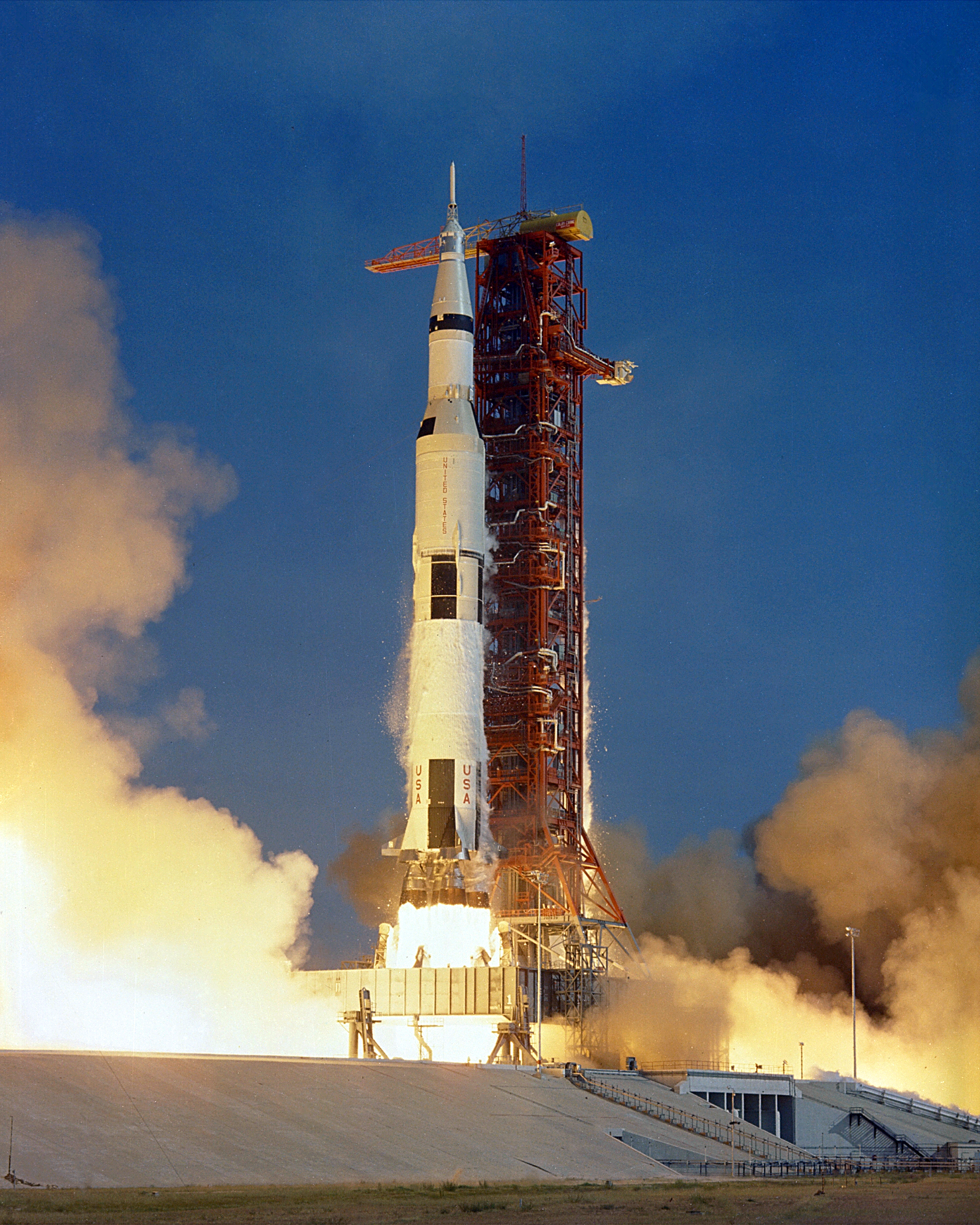
Apollo 11, the mission to land the first men on the Moon, launched on July 16, 1969, from Kennedy Space Center Launch Complex 39A

The Apollo program was a United States human spaceflight program carried out from 1961 to 1972 by the National Aeronautics and Space Administration (NASA), which landed the first astronauts on the Moon. The program used the Saturn IB and Saturn V launch vehicles to lift the Command/Service Module (CSM) and Lunar Module (LM) spacecraft into space, and the Little Joe II rocket to test a launch escape system which was expected to carry the astronauts to safety in the event of a Saturn failure. Uncrewed test flights beginning in 1966 demonstrated the safety of the launch vehicles and spacecraft to carry astronauts, and four crewed flights beginning in October 1968 demonstrated the ability of the spacecraft to carry out a lunar landing mission.

Apollo achieved the first crewed lunar landing on the Apollo 11 mission, when Neil Armstrong and Buzz Aldrin landed their LM Eagle in the Sea of Tranquility and walked on the lunar surface, while Michael Collins remained in lunar orbit in the CSM Columbia, and all three landed safely on Earth on July 24, 1969. Five subsequent missions landed astronauts on various lunar sites, ending in December 1972 with 12 men having walked on the Moon and 842 pounds (382 kg) of lunar rocks and soil samples returned to Earth, greatly contributing to the understanding of the Moon's composition and geological history.

Two Apollo missions were failures: a 1967 cabin fire killed the entire Apollo 1 crew during a ground test in preparation for what was to be the first crewed flight; and the third landing attempt on Apollo 13 was aborted by an oxygen tank explosion en route to the Moon, which disabled the CSM Odyssey's electrical power and life support systems, and made the propulsion system unsafe to use. The crew circled the Moon and were returned safely to Earth.

== Uncrewed test flights ==
From 1961 through 1967, Saturn launch vehicles and Apollo spacecraft components were tested in uncrewed flights.

=== Saturn I ===
The Saturn I launch vehicle was originally planned to carry crewed Command Module flights into low Earth orbit, but its 20,000-pound (9,100 kg) payload capacity limit could not lift even a partially fueled Service Module, which would have required building a lightweight retrorocket module for deorbit. These plans were eventually scrapped in favor of using the uprated Saturn IB to launch the Command Module with a half-fueled Service Module for crewed Earth orbit tests. This limited Saturn I flights to Saturn launch vehicle development, CSM boilerplate testing, and three Pegasus micrometeoroid satellite missions in support of Apollo.

Saturn I missions
Mission	LV	Launch	Pad	Remarks	Refs
SA-1	SA-1	October 27, 1961, 15:06	LC-34	Test of Saturn I first stage S-I; dummy upper stages carried water	
SA-2	SA-2	April 25, 1962, 14:00	LC-34	Dummy upper stages released 22,900 U.S. gallons (86,685 L) of water into upper atmosphere, to investigate effects on radio transmission and changes in local weather conditions	
SA-3	SA-3	November 16, 1962, 17:45	LC-34	Repeat of SA-2 mission	
SA-4	SA-4	March 28, 1963, 20:11	LC-34	Test premature shutdown of a single S-I engine	
SA-5	SA-5	January 29, 1964, 16:25	LC-37B	First flight of live second stage. First orbital flight.	
AS-101	SA-6	May 28, 1964, 17:07	LC-37B	Tested first boilerplate Apollo command and service module (CSM) for structural integrity	
AS-102	SA-7	September 18, 1964, 17:22	LC-37B	Carried first programmable-in-flight computer on the Saturn I vehicle; last launch vehicle development flight	
AS-103	SA-9	February 16, 1965, 14:37	LC-37B	Carried Pegasus A satellite and boilerplate CSM	
AS-104	SA-8	May 25, 1965, 07:35	LC-37B	Carried Pegasus B satellite and boilerplate CSM	
AS-105	SA-10	July 30, 1965, 13:00	LC-37B	Carried Pegasus C satellite and boilerplate CSM	

There was some incongruity in the numbering and naming of the first three uncrewed Apollo-Saturn (AS) or Apollo flights. This is due to AS-204 being renamed to Apollo 1 posthumously. This crewed flight was to have followed the first three uncrewed flights. After the fire which killed the AS-204 crew on the pad during a test and training exercise, uncrewed Apollo flights resumed to test the Saturn V launch vehicle and the Lunar Module; these were designated Apollo 4, 5 and 6. The first crewed Apollo mission was thus Apollo 7. Simple "Apollo" numbers were never assigned to the first three uncrewed flights, although renaming AS-201, AS-202, and AS-203 as Apollo 1-A, Apollo 2 and Apollo 3, had been briefly considered.

=== Saturn IB ===
The Saturn I was converted to the Uprated Saturn I, eventually designated Saturn IB, by replacing the S-IV second stage with the S-IVB, which would also be used as the third stage of the Saturn V with the addition of on-orbit restart capability. This increased the payload capacity to 46,000 pounds (21,000 kg), enough to orbit a Command Module with a half-fueled Service Module, and more than enough to orbit a fully fueled Lunar Module.

Two suborbital tests of the Apollo Block I Command and Service Module, one S-IVB development test, and one Lunar Module test were conducted. Success of the LM test led to cancellation of a planned second uncrewed flight.

Saturn IB missions
Mission	LV	Launch	Pad	Remarks	Refs
AS-201	SA-201	February 26, 1966, 16:12	LC-34	First test of Saturn IB and Block I Apollo CSM. Suborbital flight landed the CM in the Atlantic Ocean, demonstrating the heat shield. Propellant pressure loss caused premature SM engine shutdown.	
AS-203	SA-203	July 5, 1966, 14:53	LC-37B	No Apollo spacecraft; instrumentation and video observed on-orbit behavior of S-IVB liquid hydrogen fuel in support of restart capability design for Saturn V. Deemed a success, despite inadvertent destruction of S-IVB during final overpressure tank rupture test.	
AS-202	SA-202	August 25, 1966, 17:15	LC-34	Suborbital flight to Pacific Ocean splashdown. CM heat shield tested to higher speed; successful SM firings.	
Apollo 5	SA-204	January 22, 1968, 22:48	LC-37B	First flight of LM successfully fired descent engine and ascent engines; demonstrated "fire-in-the-hole" landing abort test.	

=== Launch escape system tests ===
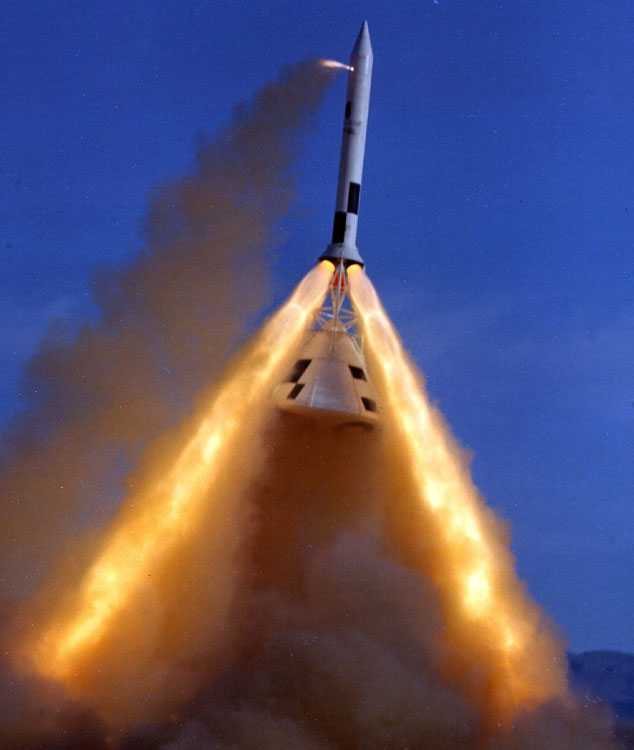
Pad Abort Test 2 with boilerplate command module

From August 1963 to January 1966, a number of tests were conducted at the White Sands Missile Range for development of the launch escape system (LES). These included simulated "pad aborts", which might occur while the Apollo-Saturn space vehicle was still on the launch pad, and flights on the Little Joe II rocket to simulate Mode I aborts which might occur while the vehicle was in the air.

Launch escape system tests
Mission	LV	Launch	Pad	Remarks	Refs
QTV	Little Joe II	August 28, 1963, 13:05	LC-36	Little Joe II qualification test	
Pad Abort Test 1	—N/a	November 7, 1963, 16:00	LC-36	Launch escape system (LES) abort test from launch pad	
A-001	Little Joe II	May 13, 1964, 13:00	LC-36	LES transonic test, success except for parachute failure	
A-002	Little Joe II	December 8, 1964, 15:00	LC-36	LES maximum altitude, Max-Q abort test	
A-003	Little Joe II	May 19, 1965, 13:01	LC-36	LES canard maximum altitude abort test	
Pad Abort Test 2	—N/a	June 29, 1965, 13:00	LC-36	LES pad abort test of near Block-I CM	
A-004	Little Joe II	January 20, 1966, 15:17	LC-36	LES test of maximum weight, tumbling Block-I CM	

=== Saturn V ===
Prior to George Mueller's tenure as NASA's Associate Administrator for Manned Space Flight starting in 1963, it was assumed that 20 Saturn Vs, with at least 10 unpiloted test flights, would be required to achieve a crewed Moon landing, using the conservative one-stage-at-a-time testing philosophy used for the Saturn I. But Mueller introduced the "all-up" testing philosophy of using three live stages plus the Apollo spacecraft on every test flight. This achieved development of the Saturn V with far fewer uncrewed tests, enabling a Moon landing by the 1969 goal. The size of the Saturn V production lot was reduced from 20 to 15 units.

Three uncrewed test flights were planned to human-rate the super heavy-lift Saturn V which would take crewed Apollo flights to the Moon. Success of the first flight and qualified success of the second led to the decision to cancel the third uncrewed test.

Saturn V missions
Mission	LV	Launch	Pad	Remarks	Refs
Apollo 4	SA-501	November 9, 1967, 12:00	LC-39A	First flight of Saturn V rocket; successfully demonstrated S-IVB third stage restart and tested CM heat shield at lunar re-entry speeds.	
Apollo 6	SA-502	April 4, 1968, 16:12	LC-39A	Second flight of Saturn V; severe "pogo" vibrations caused two second-stage engines to shut down prematurely, and third stage restart to fail. SM engine used to achieve high-speed re-entry, though less than Apollo 4. NASA identified vibration fixes and declared Saturn V man-rated.	

== Alphabetical mission types ==
The Apollo program required sequential testing of several major mission elements in the runup to a crewed lunar landing. An alphabetical list of major mission types was proposed by Owen Maynard in September 1967. Two "A-type" missions performed uncrewed tests of the CSM and the Saturn V, and one B-type mission performed an uncrewed test of the LM. The C-type mission, the first crewed flight of the CSM in Earth orbit, was performed by Apollo 7.

The list was revised upon George Low's proposal to commit a mission to lunar orbit ahead of schedule, an idea influenced by the status of the CSM as a proven craft and production delays of the LM. Apollo 8 was reclassified from its original assignment as a D-type mission, a test of the complete CSM/LM spacecraft in Earth orbit, to a "C-prime" mission which would fly humans to the Moon. Once complete, it eliminated the need for the E-type objective of a medium Earth orbital test. The D-type mission was instead performed by Apollo 9; the F-type mission, Apollo 10, flew the CSM/LM spacecraft to the Moon for final testing, without landing. The G-type mission, Apollo 11, performed the first lunar landing, the central goal of the program.

The initial A–G list was expanded to include later mission types: H-type missions—Apollo 12, 13 (planned) and 14—would perform precision landings on the lunar surface, and J-type missions—Apollo 15, 16 and 17—would perform thorough scientific investigation of the Moon from the lunar surface. The I-type mission, which called for extended scientific investigation of the Moon from lunar orbit, was incorporated into the J-type missions.

Alphabetical mission types of the Apollo Program
Type	Mission	Description
A	Apollo 4; Apollo 6	Uncrewed flights of launch vehicles and the CSM, to demonstrate its design and to certify its safety for humans. (Note: Although the A-type designation was used in official documents to refer only to Apollo 4 and Apollo 6, specifically their uncrewed orbital flights of the CSM and use of the Saturn V rocket, Samuel C. Phillips also used the A-type designation to refer to AS-201, AS-203 and AS-202: "A. Uncrewed flights of launch vehicles and the CSM, to demonstrate the adequacy of their design and to certify safety for men. Five of these flights were flown between February 1966 and April 1968; Apollo 6 was the last.")
B	Apollo 5	Uncrewed flight of the LM to demonstrate its design and to certify its safety for humans.
C	Apollo 7	Crewed flight demonstration of CSM in low Earth orbit.
C′	Apollo 8	Crewed flight demonstration of CSM in lunar orbit.
D	Apollo 9	Crewed flight demonstration of CSM and LM in low Earth orbit, operating the equipment together in space and (insofar as possible in Earth orbit) performing the maneuvers involved in a lunar landing.
E	—N/a	Crewed flight demonstration of CSM and LM in medium Earth orbit, performing the maneuvers involved in a lunar landing.
F	Apollo 10	Crewed flight demonstration of CSM and LM in lunar orbit, performing all G-type mission goals except for the final descent to and landing on the lunar surface.
G	Apollo 11	Crewed lunar landing demonstration.
H	Apollo 12; Apollo 13 (planned); Apollo 14	Precision crewed lunar landing demonstration and systematic lunar exploration.
I	—N/a	Extended scientific investigation of the Moon from lunar orbit. (Not used, incorporated into J type)
J	Apollo 15; Apollo 16; Apollo 17	Extended scientific investigation of the Moon on the lunar surface and from lunar orbit.

== Crewed missions ==
The Block I CSM spacecraft did not have capability to fly with the LM, and the three crew positions were designated Command Pilot, Senior Pilot, and Pilot, based on U.S. Air Force pilot ratings. The Block II spacecraft was designed to fly with the Lunar Module, so the corresponding crew positions were designated Commander, Command Module Pilot, and Lunar Module Pilot regardless of whether a Lunar Module was present or not on any mission.

Seven of the missions involved extravehicular activity (EVA), spacewalks or moonwalks outside of the spacecraft. These were of three types: testing the lunar EVA suit in Earth orbit (Apollo 9), exploring the lunar surface, and retrieving film canisters from the Scientific Instrument Module stored in the Service Module.

Crewed missions
Mission	Patch	Launch date	Crew	Launch vehicle (Note: Serial number displayed in parentheses)	CM name	LM name	Duration	Remarks	Refs
Apollo 1	Apollo 1 mission patch	February 21, 1967 Launch Complex 34 (planned)	Gus Grissom; Ed White; Roger B. Chaffee	Saturn IB (SA-204)	—N/a	—N/a	—N/a	Never launched. On January 27, 1967, a fire in the command module during a launch pad test killed the crew and destroyed the module. This flight was originally designated AS-204, and was renamed to Apollo 1 at the request of the crew's families.	
Apollo 7	Apollo 7 mission patch	October 11, 1968, 15:02 GMT Launch Complex 34	Wally Schirra; Donn F. Eisele; Walter Cunningham	Saturn IB (AS-205)	—N/a	—N/a	10 d 20 h 09 m 03 s	Test flight of Block II CSM in Earth orbit; included first live TV broadcast from American spacecraft.	
Apollo 8	Apollo 8 mission patch	December 21, 1968, 12:51 GMT Launch Complex 39A	Frank Borman; James Lovell; William Anders	Saturn V (SA-503)	—N/a	—N/a	06 d 03 h 00 m 42 s	First humans to leave Earth orbit and first to arrive at the Moon, first circumlunar flight of CSM, had ten lunar orbits in 20 hours. First crewed flight of Saturn V.	
Apollo 9	Apollo 9 mission patch	March 3, 1969, 16:00 GMT Launch Complex 39A	James McDivitt; David Scott; Rusty Schweickart	Saturn V (SA-504)	Gumdrop	Spider	10 d 01 h 00 m 54 s	First crewed flight test of Lunar Module; tested propulsion, rendezvous and docking in Earth orbit. EVA tested the Portable Life Support System (PLSS).	
Apollo 10	Apollo 10 mission patchogo	May 18, 1969, 16:49 GMT Launch Complex 39B	Thomas P. Stafford; John Young; Eugene Cernan	Saturn V (SA-505)	Charlie Brown	Snoopy	08 d 00 h 03 m 23 s	"Dress rehearsal" for lunar landing. The LM descended to 8.4 nautical miles (15.6 km) from lunar surface.	
Apollo 11	Apollo 11 pission patch	July 16, 1969, 13:32 GMT Launch Complex 39A	Neil Armstrong; Michael Collins; Edwin "Buzz" Aldrin	Saturn V (SA-506)	Columbia	Eagle	08 d 03 h 18 m 35 s	First crewed landing in Sea of Tranquility (Tranquility Base) including a single surface EVA.	
Apollo 12	Apollo 12 mission patch	November 14, 1969, 16:22 GMT Launch Complex 39A	Charles (Pete) Conrad; Richard F. Gordon Jr. Alan Bean	Saturn V (SA-507)	Yankee Clipper	Intrepid	10 d 04 h 36 m 24 s	First precise Moon landing in Ocean of Storms near Surveyor 3 probe. Two surface EVAs and returned parts of Surveyor to Earth.	
Apollo 13	Apollo 13 mission patch	April 11, 1970, 19:13 GMT Launch Complex 39A	James Lovell; Jack Swigert; Fred Haise	Saturn V (SA-508)	Odyssey	Aquarius	05 d 22 h 54 m 41 s	Intended Fra Mauro landing cancelled after SM oxygen tank exploded. LM used as "lifeboat" for safe crew return. First S-IVB stage impact on Moon for active seismic test.	
Apollo 14	Apollo 14 mission patch	January 31, 1971, 21:03 GMT Launch Complex 39A	Alan Shepard; Stuart Roosa; Edgar Mitchell	Saturn V (SA-509)	Kitty Hawk	Antares	09 d 00 h 01 m 58 s	Successful Fra Mauro landing. Broadcast first color TV images from lunar surface (other than a few moments at the start of the Apollo 12 moonwalk.) Conducted first materials science experiments in space. Conducted two surface EVAs.	
Apollo 15	Apollo 15 misison patch	July 26, 1971, 13:34 GMT Launch Complex 39A	David Scott; Alfred Worden; James Irwin	Saturn V (SA-510)	Endeavour	Falcon	12 d 07 h 11 m 53 s	Landing at Hadley–Apennine. First extended LM, three-day lunar stay. First use of Lunar Roving Vehicle. Conducted three lunar surface EVAs and one deep space EVA on return to retrieve orbital camera film from SM.	
Apollo 16	Apollo 16 mission patch	April 16, 1972, 17:54 GMT Launch Complex 39A	John Young; Ken Mattingly; Charles Duke	Saturn V (SA-511)	Casper	Orion	11 d 01 h 51 m 05 s	Landing in Descartes Highlands. Conducted three lunar EVAs and one deep space EVA.	
Apollo 17	Apollo 17 mission patch	December 7, 1972, 05:33 GMT Launch Complex 39A	Eugene Cernan; Ronald Evans; Harrison Schmitt	Saturn V (SA-512)	America	Challenger	12d 13 h 51 m 59 s	Landing at Taurus–Littrow. First professional geologist on the Moon. First night launch. Conducted three lunar EVAs and one deep space EVA.	

=== Canceled missions ===
Several planned missions of the Apollo program were canceled for a variety of reasons, including changes in technical direction, the Apollo 1 fire, hardware delays, and budget limitations.

- Before the Apollo 1 fire, two crewed Block I spacecraft missions were planned, but then it was decided that the second one would give no more information about the spacecraft performance not obtained from the first, and could not carry out extra activities such as EVA, and was canceled.
- The Saturn V's all-up testing strategy and relatively good success rate accomplished the first Moon landing on the sixth flight, leaving ten available for Moon landings through Apollo 20, but waning public interest in the program led to decreased Congressional funding, forcing NASA to economize. First, Apollo 20 was cut to make a Saturn V available to launch the Skylab space station whole instead of building it on-orbit using multiple Saturn IB launches. Eight months later, Apollo 18 and 19 were also cut to further economize, and because of fears of increased chance of failure with a large number of lunar flights.

Canceled missions
As planned							As flown					
Mission	Type	Date	Landing site	CDR	CMP	LMP	Mission	Launch date	Landing site	CDR	CMP	LMP
Apollo 12 (Note: If Apollo 11 was unable to land on the Moon, Apollo 12 would have been the US's next attempt. With the successful landing, Apollo 12 was converted to a geological mission.)	H	November 1969	Ocean of Storms	Pete Conrad	Richard F. Gordon Jr.	Alan Bean	Apollo 12	November 14, 1969	Ocean of Storms	Pete Conrad	Richard F. Gordon Jr.	Alan Bean
Apollo 13	H	March 1970	Fra Mauro highlands	Alan Shepard	Stuart Roosa	Edgar Mitchell	Apollo 13	April 11, 1970	Failed	Jim Lovell	Jack Swigert	Fred Haise
Apollo 14	H	July 1970	Censorinus crater	Jim Lovell	Ken Mattingly	Fred Haise	Apollo 14	January 31, 1971	Fra Mauro highlands	Alan Shepard	Stuart Roosa	Edgar Mitchell
Apollo 15	H	November 1970	Littrow crater	David Scott	Alfred Worden	James Irwin	Apollo 15	July 26, 1971	Hadley Rille	David Scott	Alfred Worden	James Irwin
Apollo 16	J	April 1971	Tycho crater	John Young	Jack Swigert	Charles Duke	Apollo 16	April 16, 1972	Descartes Highlands	John Young	Ken Mattingly	Charles Duke
Apollo 17	J	September 1971	Marius Hills	Gene Cernan	Ronald Evans	Joe Engle	Apollo 17	December 7, 1972	Taurus-Littrow	Gene Cernan	Ronald Evans	Harrison Schmitt
Apollo 18	J	February 1972	Schroter's Valley	Richard F. Gordon Jr.	Vance Brand	Harrison Schmitt	CANCELED September 1970					
Apollo 19	J	July 1972	Hyginus Rille	Fred Haise	William Pogue	Gerald Carr	CANCELED September 1970					
Apollo 20	J	December 1972	Copernicus crater	Stuart Roosa	Don L. Lind	Jack Lousma	CANCELED January 4, 1970					

== See also ==
There were two NASA post-Apollo crewed spaceflight programs that used Apollo hardware:

- Skylab § Mission designations – space laboratory missions lasting up to 83 days
- Apollo–Soyuz – first joint US / Soviet crewed spaceflight

== Bibliography ==
- Hallion, Richard P.; Crouch, Tom D. (1979). Apollo: Ten Years Since Tranquility Base. Smithsonian Institution. Bibcode:1979atys.book.....H. ISBN 978-0-87474-505-4.
