= Pad Abort Test 2 =

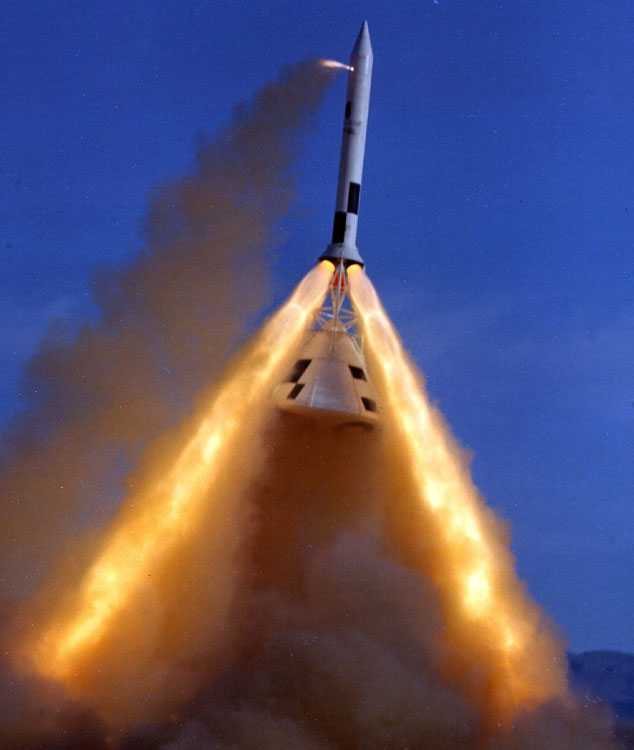
- Apollo LES Pad Abort Test (NASA)
- Mission type: Abort test
- Operator: NASA
- Mission duration: 1 minute, 52.6 seconds
- Distance travelled: 2.32 kilometers (1.44 mi)
- Apogee: 2.82 kilometers (1.75 mi)

Spacecraft properties
- Spacecraft: Apollo BP-23A

Start of mission
- Launch date: June 29, 1965, 13:00:01 UTC
- Rocket: Apollo LES
- Launch site: White Sands LC-36

End of mission
- Landing date: June 29, 1965, 13:01:54 UTC
- Project Apollo; Abort tests

Pad Abort Test 2 was the follow-on second abort test to Pad Abort Test 1 of the Apollo spacecraft.

== Objectives ==
Apollo Pad Abort Test 2 was the fifth of six uncrewed Apollo missions that flight tested the capability of the launch escape system (LES) to provide for safe recovery of Apollo crews under critical abort conditions. This flight was the second test of the launch escape system with the abort initiated from the launch pad.

The launch escape system included qualified launch escape and pitch motors and was equipped with canards to orient the vehicle aft heat shield forward prior to tower jettison and parachute deployment. A boost protective cover was also provided. The spacecraft was BP-23A, a boilerplate Apollo command module that had been used on mission A-002 and refurbished to more nearly simulate a Block-I-type command module in mass and other characteristics. The Earth landing system was similar to the one used in mission A-003.

== Flight ==
The test flight was conducted on June 29, 1965. The vehicle was lifted from Launch Complex 36 by the launch escape motor at 13:00:01 UTC (06:00:01 MST). The launch escape and pitch control motors ignited simultaneously, placing the test vehicle into the planned initial trajectory. A moderate roll rate developed at lift-off, which was due to the aerodynamic asymmetry of the vehicle configuration; however, the roll rate did not affect the success of the test.

The canard surfaces deployed and turned the vehicle to the desired orientation for drogue parachute deployment. During the turnaround maneuver, the launch escape tower and forward heat shield were jettisoned as planned. The boost protective cover, which was attached to the launch escape system, protected the conical surface of the command module and remained intact through a canard-induced pitch maneuver. At tower jettison, the soft boost protective cover, as expected, collapsed because of differential pressure during removal from the command module. No recontact or interference between the major components was evident during tower jettison and parachute deployment.

Although one of the pilot parachute steel cable risers was kinked, the Earth landing system functioned properly. The drogue parachutes inflated and stabilized the command module for pilot and main parachute deployment, and the rate of descent while on the main parachutes was satisfactory. The maximum altitude achieved was 9,258 feet (2,822 m) above mean sea level, approximately 650 feet (200 m) higher than predicted. The command module landed about 7,600 feet (2,300 m) from the launch site, some 2,000 feet (610 m) farther than planned.

Four glass samples had been mounted on the command module in the general area planned for the rendezvous and crew windows. No soot appeared on the samples, but an oily film was found on the exposed surfaces of three of the four samples. This film, however, was not expected to cause excessive degradation to the horizon scan or ground orientation ability during an abort. The test was highly successful and all planned objectives were fulfilled.
