= A-001 =

1964 abort test of the Apollo spacecraft

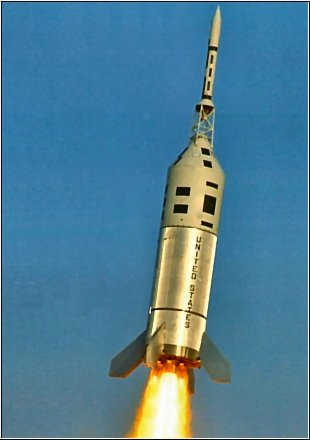
- Little Joe II launch with A-001
- Mission type: Abort test
- Operator: NASA
- Mission duration: 5 minutes, 50.3 seconds
- Distance travelled: 6.82 kilometers (4.24 mi)
- Apogee: 9.08 kilometers (5.64 mi)

Spacecraft properties
- Spacecraft: Apollo BP-12

Start of mission
- Launch date: May 13, 1964; 61 years ago
- Rocket: Little Joe II
- Launch site: White Sands LC-36

End of mission
- Landing date: May 13, 1964, 13:05:51 UTC
- Project Apollo; Abort Tests

A-001 was the second abort test of the Apollo spacecraft.

== Objectives ==
Mission A-001 was the second in the series of tests conducted to demonstrate that the launch escape system could safely remove the command module under critical abort conditions. Unlike Pad Abort Test 1, in which the launch escape system was ignited at ground level, this mission was flown to demonstrate the capability of the escape system to propel the command module safely away from a launch vehicle while in the high-dynamic-pressure (transonic) region of the Saturn trajectory.

The launch vehicle was the second in the series of Little Joe II vehicles, which had been developed to accomplish early and economical testing of the launch escape system. The Little Joe II was propelled by seven solid-propellant rocket motors - one Algol sustainer motor, which provided thrust for about 42 seconds, and six Recruit motors, which burned out approximately 1.5 seconds after ignition. The spacecraft consisted of a launch escape system and a boilerplate command and service module (BP-12).

== Flight ==
Unacceptable wind conditions had forced a 24-hour postponement of the launch, but the vehicle was successfully launched on May 13, 1964, at 12:59:59.7 UTC (05:59 am MST). A ground commanded abort signal terminated thrust of the launch vehicle (by rupturing the Algol motor casing), ignited the launch escape and pitch control motors, and separated the command module from the service module. Some structural damage was incurred by the command module aft heat shield because of recontact with the booster at thrust termination. At approximately 44 seconds, the tower jettison motor was ignited and satisfactorily separated the launch escape tower from the command module.

The Earth landing sequence was normal until a riser for one of the three main parachutes broke as a result of its rubbing against the structure on the command module upper deck. The parachute separated; however, the command module, supported by the two remaining parachutes, descended at rates of 9.1 to 7.9 metres per second (30 to 26 ft/s) instead of the predicted 7.3 metres per second (24 ft/s) with three parachutes. The command module landed 6.8 kilometres (22,400 ft) downrange at 350.2 seconds after attaining an altitude of 9.075 kilometres (29,772 ft) above mean sea level. Except for the parachute failure, all test objectives were satisfied.

== Boilerplate location ==
The boilerplate is currently located at the Columbia Memorial Space Center in Downey, California.
