= PA2 =

PA2 may refer to:

- ALCO PA-2, a diesel locomotive
- French aircraft carrier PA2 (French: Porte-avion 2; aircraft carrier 2), a cancelled ship of the French Navy
- Pad Abort Test 2, an Apollo program mission
- Paranormal Activity 2, a 2010 American supernatural horror film
- Pennsylvania's 2nd congressional district
- Pennsylvania Route 2, a former state route in Pennsylvania
- Pitcairn PA-2 Sesquiwing, a biplane
- The PA2, a type of rolling stock used on the PATH train in New York and New Jersey
- PA2 key, on the IBM 3270 keyboard
- pA_{2}, a measure for potency of competitive receptor antagonists, see receptor antagonist and competitive inhibition
