= QTV =

QTV may refer to:

== Television channels, stations and networks ==
- TNQ, the former branding for Southern Cross Ten in regional Queensland, Australia, was QTV
- ARY Qtv, the Pakistani Islamic television network Quran TV
- WDCQ-TV, the name of WDCQ-TV, a PBS member station, owned and operated by Delta College in the U.S. state of Michigan
- Q TV, a British music television channel based on and cobranded with the music magazine Q
- Quality TeleVision or QTV, a defunct television network in the Philippines or Q television network
- QTV, the former name of BTV, a television network in Indonesia
- Qatar Television, the national television channel of Qatar
- QTV, a TV channel in the 2001 Indian film Nayak

== Other ==
- QTV, American subsidiary of Autocue, the UK manufacturer of teleprompting equipment
- Little Joe II Qualification Test Vehicle, Qualification Test Vehicle known as the Little Joe Rocket
- Q.T.V., a defunct collegiate fraternity in the Northeastern United States
