= A-004 =

1966 Apollo spacecraft testflight

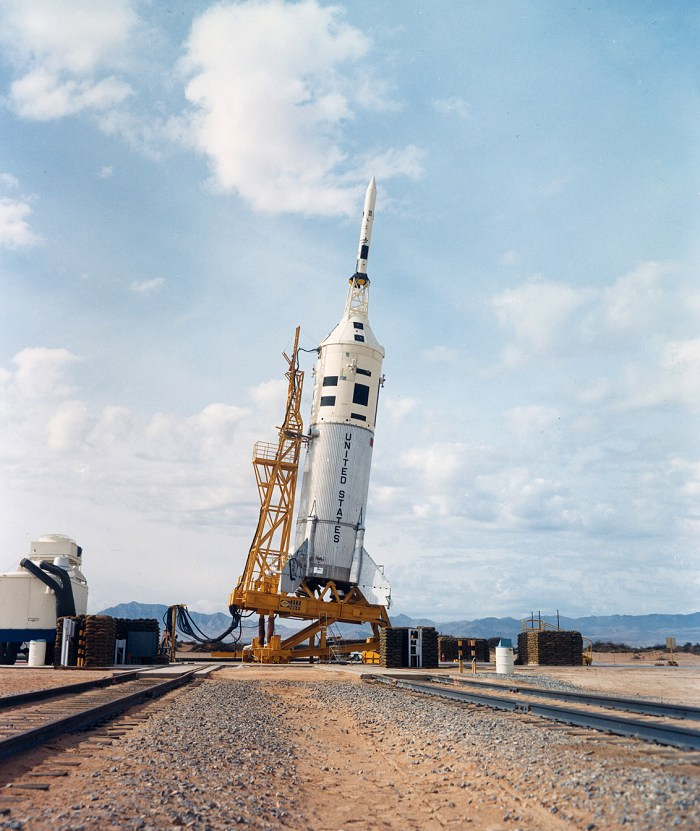
- Little Joe II A-004, White Sands, New Mexico
- Mission type: Abort test
- Operator: NASA
- Mission duration: 6 minutes, 50 seconds
- Distance travelled: 34.63 kilometers (21.52 mi)
- Apogee: 23.83 kilometers (14.81 mi)

Spacecraft properties
- Spacecraft: Apollo CM-002

Start of mission
- Launch date: January 20, 1966, 15:17:01 UTC
- Rocket: Little Joe II
- Launch site: White Sands LC-36

End of mission
- Landing date: January 20, 1966, 15:23:51 UTC
- Project Apollo; Abort Tests

A-004 was the sixth and final test of the Apollo launch escape vehicle and the first flight of a Block I production-type Apollo Command/Service Module.

== Objectives ==
Mission A-004 was uncrewed and was conducted to demonstrate that

1. The launch escape vehicle would satisfactorily orient and stabilize itself in the proper attitude after being subjected to a high rate of tumbling during the powered phase of an abort
2. The escape vehicle would maintain its structural integrity under test conditions in which the command module structure was loaded to the design limit.

The launch vehicle was the fifth and final Little Joe II flown. The propulsion system consisted of four Algol and five Recruit rocket motors. The attitude control system was similar to the one used on mission A-003 except that the reaction control system was deleted and the vehicle was provided with the capability of responding to a radio-transmitted pitch up command. The pitch up maneuver was required to help initiate tumbling of the launch vehicle. The spacecraft for this mission consisted of a modified Block I command and service module (Block I production model 002), and a modified Block I launch escape system (airframe 002). The center of gravity and thrust vector were changed to assure that power-on tumbling would be attained after abort initiation. The Earth landing system was essentially the same as that used during Pad Abort Test 2.

== Flight ==
The vehicle was launched on January 20, 1966, at 8:17:01 a.m. MST (15:17:01 UTC) after several postponements due to technical difficulties and adverse weather conditions. The pitch up maneuver was commanded from the ground when telemetry showed that the desired altitude and velocity conditions had been reached. The planned abort was automatically initiated 2.9 seconds later. The launch escape vehicle tumbled immediately after abort initiation. Pitch and yaw rates reached peak values of 160 degrees per second, and roll rates reached a peak of minus 70 degrees per second. The launch escape system canard surfaces deployed at the proper time and stabilized the command module with the aft heat shield forward after the escape vehicle had tumbled about four times. Tower jettison and operation of the Earth landing systems were normal, and the command module landed about 113,620 feet (34.6 km) from the launch pad after having reached a maximum altitude of 78,180 feet (23.8 km) above mean sea level.

All systems performed satisfactorily, and the dynamic loads and structural response values were within the design limits and predicted values. Although a structural loading value of primary interest was not achieved (local differential pressure between the interior and exterior of the command module wall), all test objectives were satisfied.

== Boilerplate location ==
The boilerplate spacecraft is currently on display at the Cradle of Aviation Museum, Garden City, New York.
