= Little Joe II =

American rocket

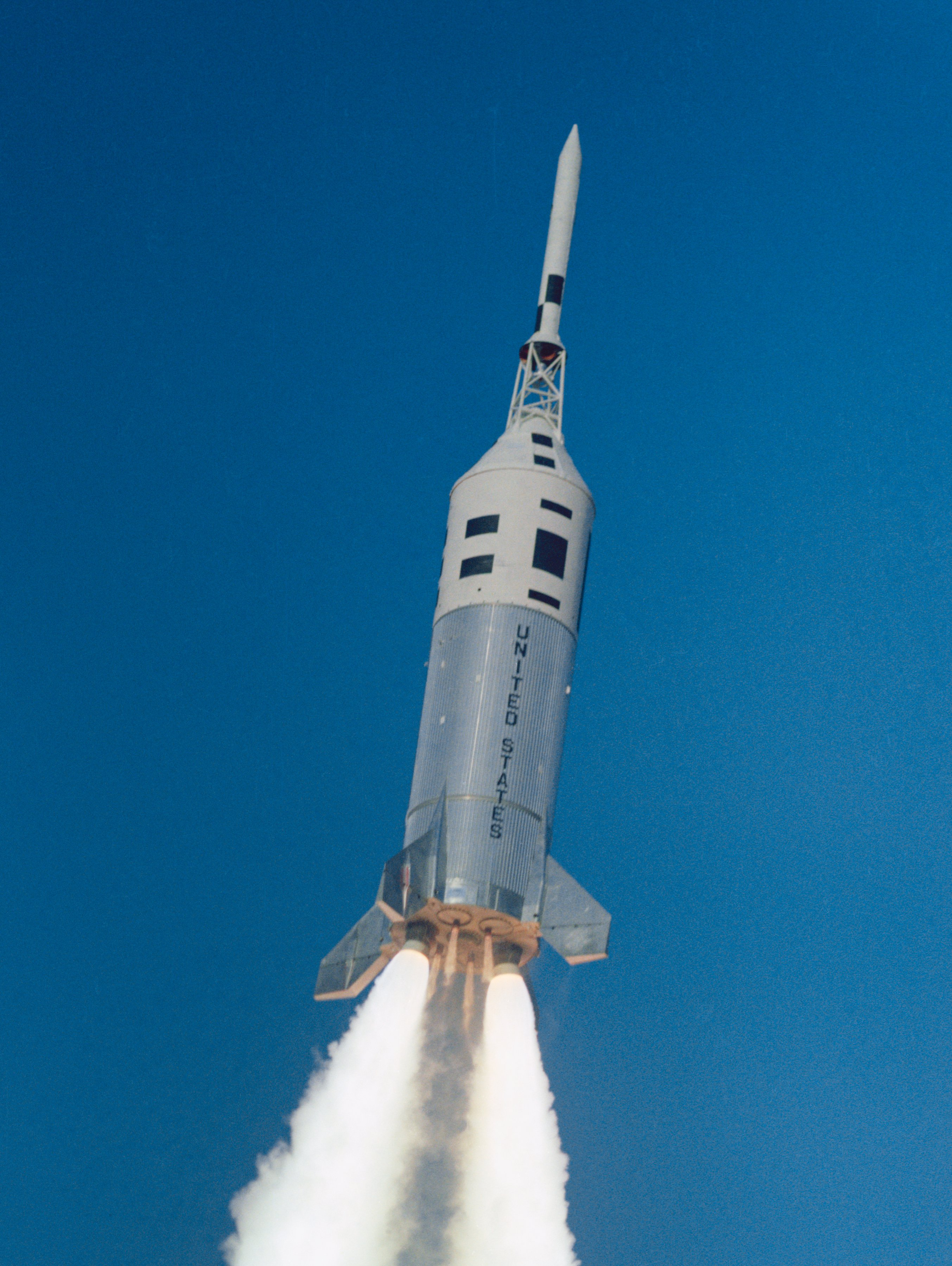
- Launch of Apollo A-002 escape system test on the third Little Joe II
- Function: Apollo launch escape system testing
- Manufacturer: Convair Division of General Dynamics
- Country of origin: United States

Size
- Height: 86 ft (26 m) with payload
- Diameter: 12 ft 10 in (3.91 m)
- Width: 28 ft 5 in (8.66 m) at fins
- Stages: 1

Launch history
- Status: Retired
- Launch sites: White Sands, LC-36
- Total launches: 5
- Success(es): 4
- Partial failure: 1
- First flight: 28 August 1963
- Last flight: 20 January 1966

Boosters
- No. boosters: 6 (Note: Varied; later flights had 0, 4, or 5 boosters.)
- Powered by: 1 Thiokol 1.5KS35000 Recruit
- Maximum thrust: 38,000 lb_{f} (170 kN)
- Total thrust: 228,000 lb_{f} (1,010 kN)
- Burn time: ~1.53 seconds
- Propellant: Solid

First stage
- Powered by: 1 Aerojet Algol 1-D sustainer (Note: Varied; later flights used 2, 4, or 6 sustainer engines.)
- Maximum thrust: 105,100 lb_{f} (468 kN)
- Burn time: ~40 seconds
- Propellant: Solid

Little Joe II was an American rocket used from 1963 to 1966 for five uncrewed tests of the Apollo spacecraft launch escape system (LES), and to verify the performance of the command module parachute recovery system in abort mode. It was named after a similar rocket designed for the same function in Project Mercury. Launched from White Sands Missile Range in New Mexico, it was the smallest of four launch rockets used in the Apollo program.

== Background ==
Man-rating of the Apollo launch escape system was planned to be accomplished at minimum cost early in the program. Since there were no reasonably priced launch vehicles with the payload capability and thrust versatility that could meet the requirements of the planned tests, a contract was awarded for the development and construction of a specialized launch vehicle. The rocket's predecessor, Little Joe, had been used in testing the launch escape system for the Mercury spacecraft from 1959 to 1960.

The program was originally planned to be conducted at the U.S. Air Force Eastern Test Range at Cape Kennedy, Florida. Because of a heavy schedule of high-priority launches at that facility, other possible launch sites were evaluated including Wallops Flight Facility, Wallops Island, Virginia, and Eglin Air Force Base, Florida. Launch Complex 36 at White Sands Missile Range, previously used for Redstone missile tests, was selected as the most suitable for meeting schedule and support requirements. White Sands also allowed land recovery which was less costly and complicated than the water recovery that would have been required at the Eastern Test Range or at the NASA Wallops Island facility.

The program was conducted under the direction of the Manned Spacecraft Center (now Johnson Space Center), Houston, Texas, with joint participation by the prime contractors for the launch vehicle (General Dynamics/Convair) and spacecraft (North American Rockwell). The White Sands Missile Range administrative, range, and technical organizations provided the facilities, resources, and services required. These included range safety, radar and camera tracking, command transmission, real-time data displays, photography, telemetry data acquisition, data reduction, and recovery operations.

== Design ==
Little Joe II was a single-stage, solid-propellant rocket which used a booster motor developed for the Recruit rocket, and a sustainer motor developed for the Algol stage of the Scout rocket family. It could fly with a variable number of booster and sustainer motors, but all were contained within a single airframe.

== Development ==
Fabrication of the detail parts for the first vehicle started in August 1962, and the final factory systems checkout was completed in July 1963. There was an original fixed-fin configuration and a later version using flight controls.

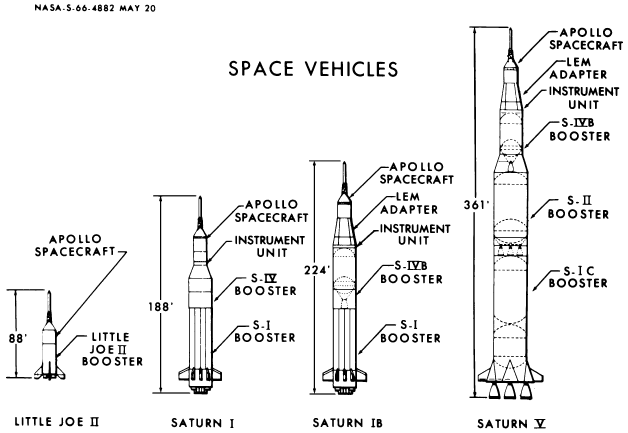
Four Apollo rocket assemblies, drawn to scale: Little Joe II, Saturn I, Saturn IB, and Saturn V.

The vehicle was sized to match the diameter of the Apollo spacecraft service module and to suit the length of the Algol rocket motors. Aerodynamic fins were sized to assure that the vehicle was inherently stable. The structural design was based on a gross weight of 220,000 pounds (100,000 kg), of which 80,000 pounds (36,000 kg) was payload.

The structure was also designed for sequential firing with a possible 10-second overlap of four first-stage and three second-stage sustainer motors. Sustainer thrust was provided by Algol solid-propellant motors. The versatility of performance was achieved by varying the number and firing sequence of the primary motors (capability of up to seven) required to perform the mission. Recruit rocket motors were used for booster motors as required to supplement lift-off thrust.

A simplified design, tooling, and manufacturing concept was used to limit the number of vehicle components, reduce construction time, and hold vehicle cost to a minimum. Because overall weight was not a limiting factor in the design, over designing of primary structural members greatly reduced the number and complexity of structural proof tests. Whenever possible, vehicle systems were designed to use readily available off-the-shelf components that had proven reliability from use in other aerospace programs, and this further reduced overall costs by minimizing the amount of qualification testing required.

The Little Joe II launch vehicle proved to be very acceptable for use in this program. Two difficulties were experienced. The Qualification Test Vehicle (QTV) did not destruct when commanded to do so because improperly installed primacord did not propagate the initial detonation to the shaped charges on the Algol motor case. The fourth mission (A-003) launch vehicle became uncontrolled about 2.5 seconds after lift-off when an aerodynamic fin moved to a hard over position as the result of an electronic failure. These problems were corrected and the abort test program was completed.

== Flights ==
Little Joe II flight and capsule launch-escape test.

The Qualification Test Vehicle launch, on 28 August 1963, carried a dummy payload consisting of an aluminum shell in the basic shape of the Apollo command module, with an inert LES attached, and demonstrated the rocket would work for the A-001 launch. This occurred on 13 May 1964, with a boilerplate BP-12 command module, and performed the first successful abort using a live LES.

A third launch on 8 December 1964, using BP-23, tested the effectiveness of the LES when the pressures and stresses on the spacecraft were similar to what they would be during a Saturn IB or Saturn V launch. The fourth flight, with BP-22 on 19 May 1965, was designed to test the escape system at a high altitude, although the abort actually occurred at low altitude due to a failure of the Little Joe II booster. The final launch, on 20 January 1966, carried the first production spacecraft, CSM-002.

Minor spacecraft design deficiencies in the parachute reefing cutters, the drogue and main parachute deployment mortar mountings, and the command and service module umbilical cutters were found and corrected before the crewed Apollo flights began. However, all command modules flown achieved satisfactory landing conditions and confirmed that, had they been crewed spacecraft, the crew would have survived the abort conditions.

In addition, two pad abort tests were conducted in which the launch escape system was activated at ground level.

=== Launch configuration summary ===
Item	QTV	A-001	A-002	A-003	A-004
Launch date	28 August 1963	13 May 1964	8 December 1964	19 May 1965	20 January 1966
Capsule	—N/a	BP-12	BP-23	BP-22	CSM-002
Launch weight	57,170 lb (25,930 kg)	57,940 lb (26,281 kg)	94,331 lb (42,788 kg)	177,190 lb (80,372 kg)	139,731 lb (63,381 kg)
Payload	24,224 lb (10,988 kg)	25,336 lb (11,492 kg)	27,692 lb (12,561 kg)	27,836 lb (12,626 kg)	32,445 lb (14,717 kg)
Liftoff thrust	314,000 lb_{f} (1,400 kN)	314,000 lb_{f} (1,400 kN)	360,000 lb_{f} (1,600 kN)	314,000 lb_{f} (1,395 kN)	397,000 lb_{f} (1,766 kN)
Fins controlled	No	No	Yes	Yes	Yes
Recruit booster motors	6	6	4	0	5
Algol sustainer motors	1	1	2	6	4
Altitude	27,600 ft (8,400 m)	15,400 ft (4,700 m)	15,364 ft (4,683 m)	19,501 ft (5,944 m)	74,100 ft (22,600 m)
Range	48,300 ft (14,700 m)	11,580 ft (3,530 m)	7,598 ft (2,316 m)	17,999 ft (5,486 m)	113,620 ft (34,630 m)

== Surviving examples ==
- New Mexico Museum of Space History, Alamogordo, New Mexico
- Johnson Space Center, Houston, Texas

== Specifications ==
- Little Joe II
  - Thrust: 49 to 1,766 kN
  - Length: 10.1 m without CM/SM/LES
  - Length: 26.2 m with CM/SM/LES
  - Diameter: 3.9 m body
  - Fin span: 8.7 m
  - Weight: 25,900 to 80,300 kg
  - Propellant: solid
  - Burn time: ~50 s
- Algol motor
  - Thrust: 465 kN each
  - Length: 9.1 m
  - Diameter: 1 m
  - Weight full: 10,180 kg
  - Weight empty: 1,900 kg
  - Propellant: solid
  - Burn time: 40 s
- Recruit motor (Thiokol XM19)
  - Thrust: 167 kN
  - Length: 2.7 m
  - Diameter: 0.23 m
  - Weight: 159 kg
  - Propellant: solid
  - Burn time: 1.53 s
