= A-003 =

1965 abort test of the Apollo spacecraft

- Mission type: Abort test
- Operator: NASA
- Mission duration: 5 minutes, 2.8 seconds
- Distance travelled: 5.55 kilometers (3.45 mi)
- Apogee: 6.04 kilometers (3.75 mi)

Spacecraft properties
- Spacecraft: Apollo BP-22

Start of mission
- Launch date: May 19, 1965, 13:01:04 UTC
- Rocket: Little Joe II
- Launch site: White Sands LC-36

End of mission
- Landing date: May 19, 1965, 13:06:07 UTC
- Project Apollo; Abort Tests

A-003 was the fourth abort test of the Apollo spacecraft. This particular flight is notable because during the abort test flight, an actual abort situation occurred, and further proved the Apollo launch escape system (LES). The CM was successfully pulled away from the malfunctioning Little Joe booster and it landed safely under parachutes.

== Objectives ==
Apollo mission A-003 was the fourth mission to demonstrate the abort capability of the Apollo launch escape system. The purpose of this flight was to demonstrate launch escape vehicle performance at an altitude approximating the upper limit for the canard subsystem.

The launch vehicle was similar to the one used for mission A-002 except that the propulsion system consisted of six Algol motors. The uncrewed flight test vehicle consisted of an Apollo boilerplate command and service module (BP-22) and a launch escape system similar to the one used on the previous mission. The command module Earth landing system configuration was refined to be more nearly like that of the planned production system, and a forward heat shield jettisoning system was provided.

== Flight ==
The test vehicle was launched on May 19, 1965, at 6:01:04 a.m. M.S.T. (13:01:04 UTC). Within 2.5 seconds after lift-off, a launch malfunction caused the vehicle to go out of control. The launch vehicle entered into a roll which caused it to break up before second-stage ignition, and a low-altitude abort was initiated instead of the planned high-altitude abort. The launch escape system canard surfaces deployed and survived the severe environment. The high roll rates (approximately 260 degrees per second at the time of canard deployment) induced by the launch vehicle malfunction stabilized the launch escape vehicle in a tower-forward attitude, which overcame the destabilizing effect of the canards. Post-flight simulations verified the ineffectiveness of the canards at the high roll rate, but showed that canards would be effective at the 20 degree per second roll rate limit of the Saturn emergency detection system.

A-003 Aborting after booster failure.

All spacecraft systems operated satisfactorily. The command module forward heat shield was protected by the hard portion of the boost protective cover and was jettisoned satisfactorily in an apex-forward attitude at low altitude. The soft portion of the boost protective cover remained intact until tower jettison. At tower jettison, part of the cover stayed with the command module for a short time although the rest of the cover moved away with the tower. The hard portion of the boost protective cover remained intact until ground impact. Both drogue parachutes inflated, even under the severe conditions that existed; that is, command module apex forward and rolling. The command module was effectively stabilized and oriented for deployment of the main parachutes.

Because of the early launch vehicle breakup, the desired altitude of 120,000 feet (36.6 km) was not achieved. However, the spacecraft did demonstrate a successful low-altitude abort at 12,400 ft (3.8 km) from a rapidly rolling (approximately 335 degrees per second) launch vehicle. The Mach number, dynamic pressure, and altitude at the time of abort were similar to Saturn IB or Saturn V launch trajectory conditions.

== Boilerplate location ==
The BP-22 boilerplate is on display at the Johnson Space Center, Houston, Texas.
