= A-002 =

Third abort test of the Apollo spacecraft

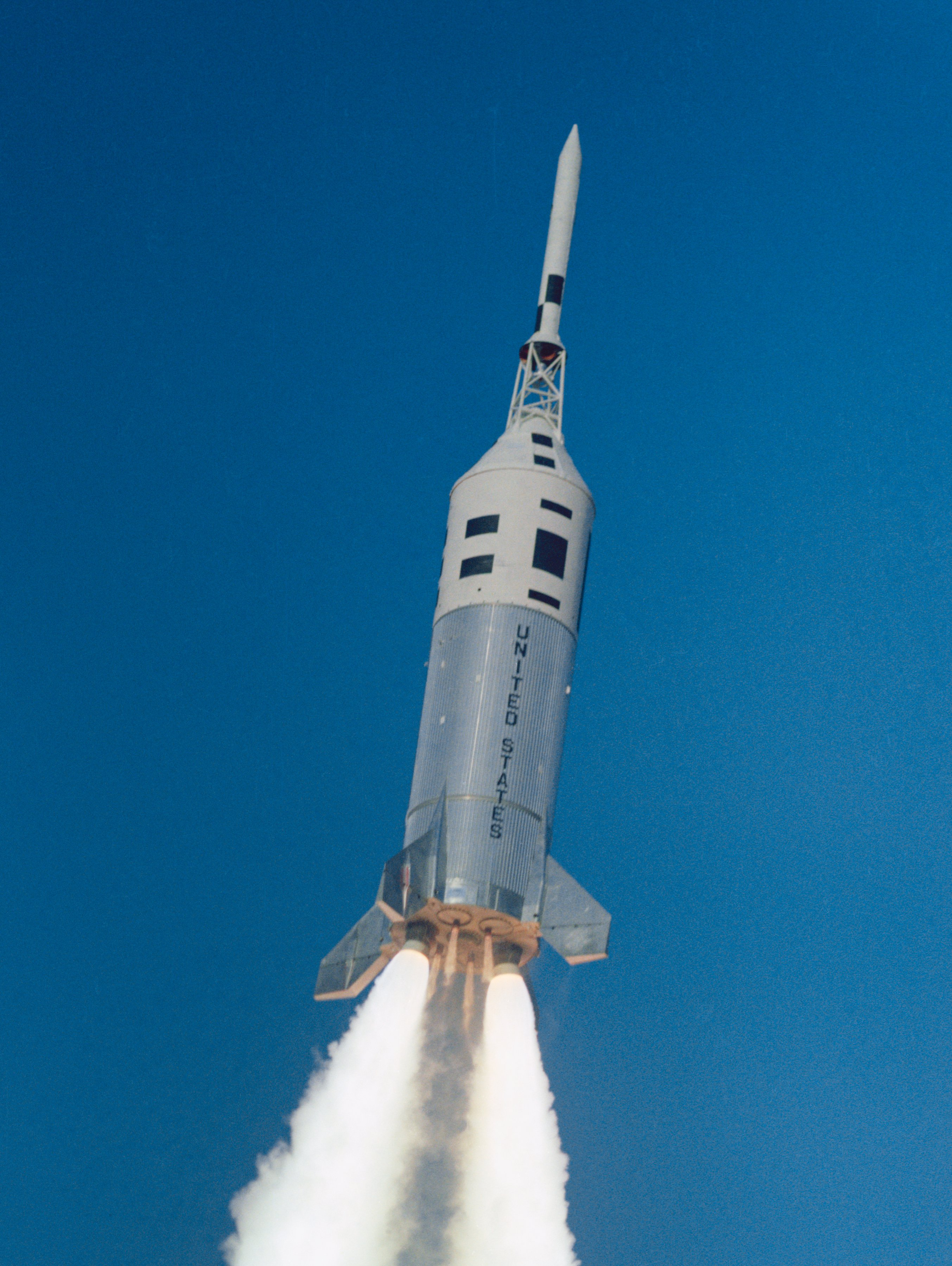
- Little Joe II A-002
- Mission type: Abort test
- Operator: NASA
- Mission duration: 7 minutes, 23.4 seconds
- Distance travelled: 9.99 kilometers (6.21 mi)
- Apogee: 15.35 kilometers (9.54 mi)

Spacecraft properties
- Spacecraft: Apollo BP-23

Start of mission
- Launch date: December 8, 1964, 15:00:00 UTC
- Rocket: Little Joe II
- Launch site: White Sands LC-36

End of mission
- Landing date: December 8, 1964, 15:07:23 UTC
- Project Apollo; Abort Tests

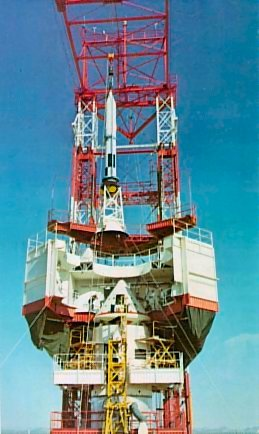
Little Joe II, LC 36, White Sands, NM (NASA)

A-002 was the third abort test of the Apollo spacecraft.

== Objectives ==
Mission A-002 was the third in the series of abort tests to demonstrate that the launch system would perform satisfactorily under selected critical abort conditions. The main objective of this mission was to demonstrate the abort capability of the launch escape vehicle in the maximum dynamic pressure region of the Saturn trajectory with conditions approximating the altitude limit at which the Saturn emergency detection system would signal an abort.

The launch vehicle was the third in the Little Joe II series. This vehicle differed from the previous two in that flight controls and instrumentation were incorporated, and the vehicle was powered by two Algol and four Recruit rocket motors. The launch escape system was also changed from previous configurations in that canards (forward control surfaces used to orient and stabilize the escape vehicle in the entry attitude) and a command module boost protective cover were incorporated. The Apollo spacecraft was simulated by a boilerplate command and service module (BP-23). The Earth landing system was modified from the previous configuration by the installation of modified dual-drogue parachutes instead of a single-drogue parachute.

== Flight ==
The A-002 vehicle was launched on December 8, 1964, at 8:00:00 a.m. M.S.T. (15:00:00 UTC) by igniting all launch vehicle motors simultaneously. Conditions at abort initiation were selected from Saturn boost trajectories, and a nominal test point was used for the maximum dynamic pressure region. A pitch up maneuver and the abort were initiated by using a real-time plot of the dynamic pressure versus Mach number. However, an improper constant was used in the meteorological data input to the real-time data system, resulting in the pitch up maneuver being initiated 2.4 seconds early. Although the planned test point was not achieved, the early pitch up caused a higher maximum dynamic pressure than the design value.

Canard deployment took place as expected 11.1 seconds after abort initiation. The launch escape vehicle tumbled four times before stabilizing with the aft heat shield forward. During the first turnaround, the soft portion of the boost protective cover was torn away from the command module. Maximum altitude attained by the launch escape vehicle was 50,360 feet (15,350 m) above mean sea level.

Baro-switches initiated the Earth landing sequence at an altitude of approximately 23,500 feet (7,163 m) above mean sea level. All parachutes deployed properly and the command module, supported by the three main parachutes, descended at the planned rate of about 24 ft/s (7 m/s) to an Earth landing 32,800 feet (10 km) down range.

The abort conditions obtained were more than adequate in verifying the abort capability in the maximum dynamic pressure region. Only one test objective was not achieved: the boost protective cover was structurally inadequate for the environment experienced during the mission.

== Boilerplate location ==
BP-23 was refurbished as BP-23A and used for Launch Pad Abort Test 2. BP-23A is on display as part of the SA-500D Saturn V exhibit at the US Space & Rocket Center, Huntsville, Alabama.
