= Pad abort test =

A pad abort test is the test of a launch escape system while sitting stationary on the ground, either on a dedicated test stand or a mockup of the launch vehicle. In the event of a fire, structural failure, or other emergency involving the launch rocket sitting on the pad, the launch escape system had to be capable of pulling the crew module up and off the rocket, with sufficient speed and altitude to outdistance a possible explosion. Once the escape rocket burn was completed, the crew module would descend under its landing parachute.

== Project Mercury ==
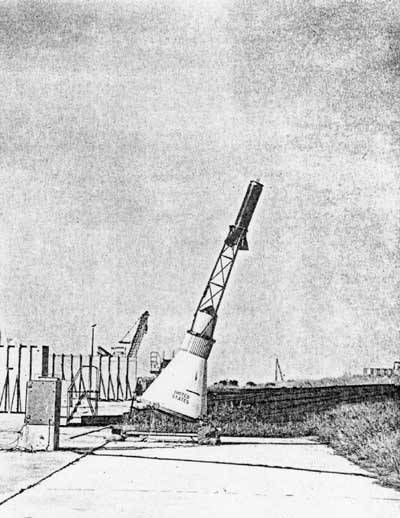
Mercury pad abort test

Section sources.

The Mercury program included several pad abort tests for the launch escape system with a boilerplate crew module.

- 1959 July 22 – First successful pad abort flight test with a functional escape tower attached to a Mercury boilerplate
- 1959 July 28 – A Mercury boilerplate with instruments to measure sound pressure levels and vibrations from the Little Joe test rocket and Grand Central abort rocket/escape tower

== Project Apollo ==
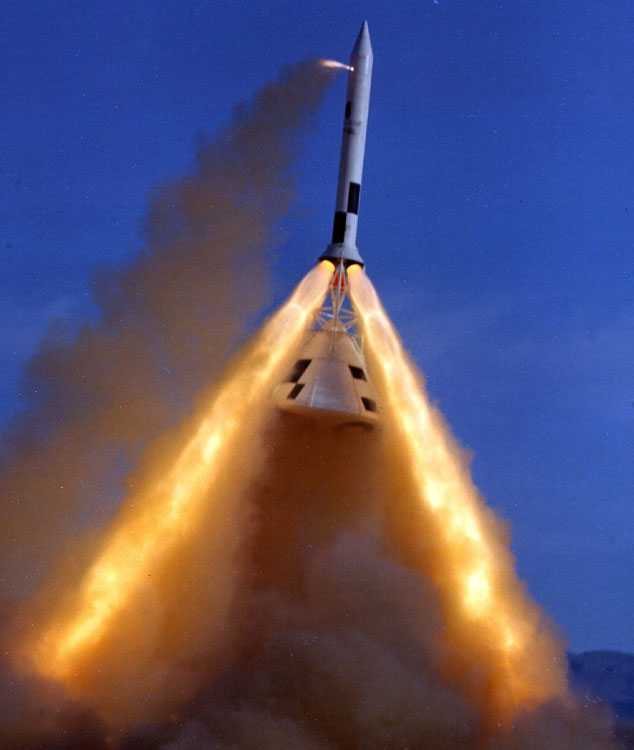
Apollo Pad Abort Test 2

The Apollo program included several pad abort tests for the launch escape system with a boilerplate crew module.

- Pad Abort Test-1 was conducted on November 7, 1963, and
- Pad Abort Test-2 was conducted on June 29, 1965.

Both tests were conducted at the White Sands Missile Range.

== Shenzhou ==
China Manned Space Program included one pad abort test for Shenzhou spacecraft, called "zero-altitude flight test"(Chinese: 零高度飞行试验), conducted on October 19, 1998 9:00 am, one year prior to first Shenzhou spacecraft mission with a successful result.

== Orion ==
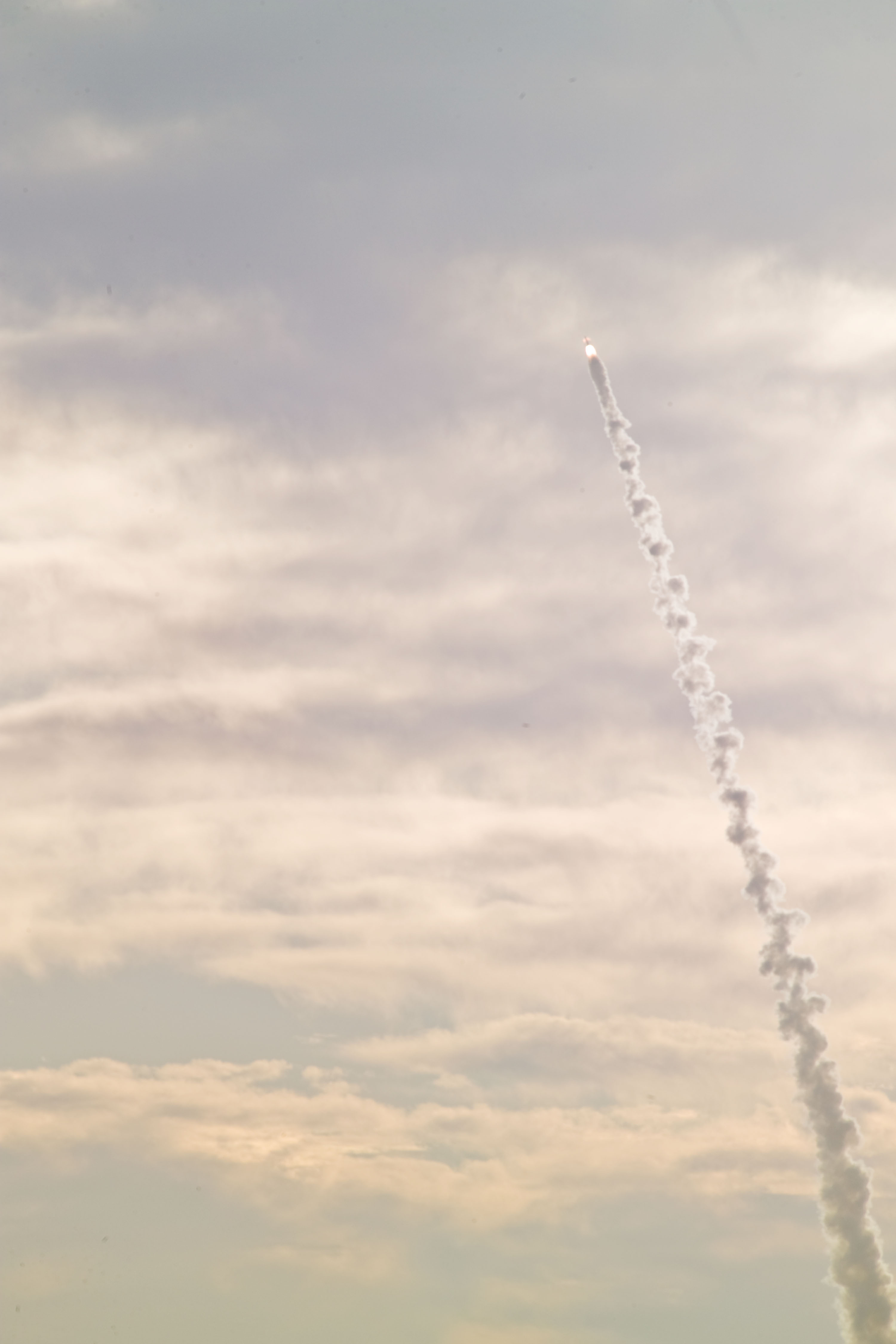
Orion Pad Abort-1

The Orion pad abort test was conducted on May 6, 2010 at the White Sands Missile Range in New Mexico. The Launch Abort System lifted the Orion Boilerplate to a height of approximately 6000 feet above the ground and landed 6,900 feet downrange about 150 seconds later. The Abort test resulted in no damage to the test article and the mission was considered a complete success.

== Commercial Crew ==
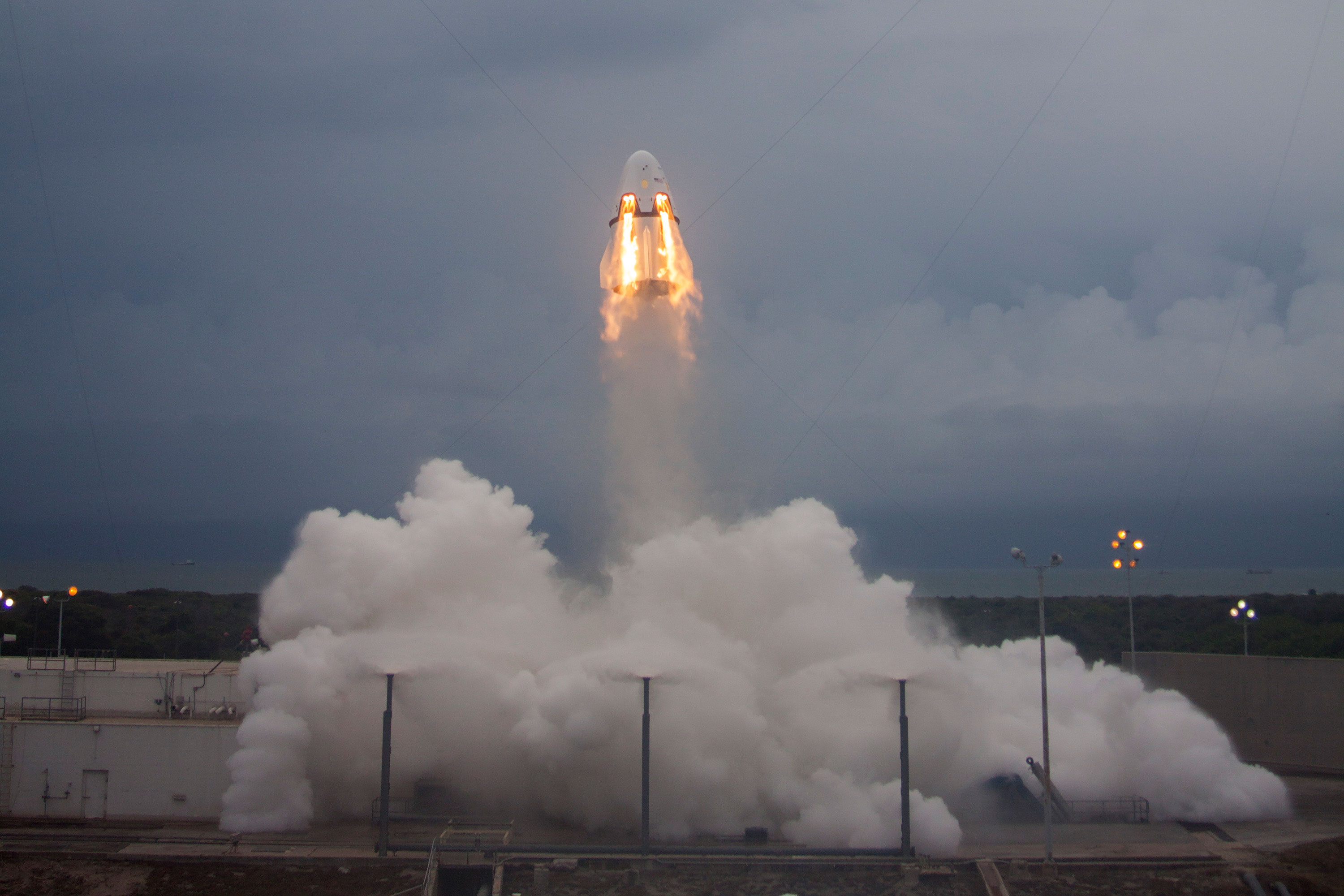
Dragon 2 abort test

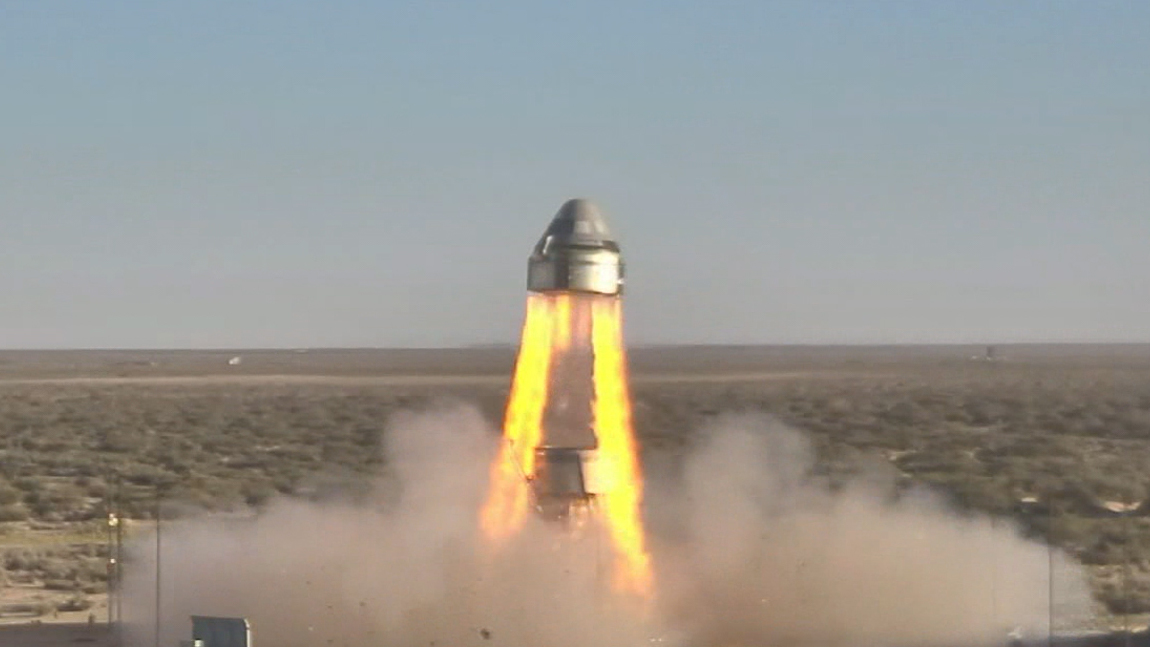
CST-100 Starliner pad abort

=== Dragon 2 ===
The SpaceX Dragon 2 Pad Abort Test was conducted on May 6, 2015 at approximately 0900 Eastern Daylight Time (EDT). (A video clip released by SpaceX shows the timestamp of the moment of launch as 13:00:00). The vehicle splashed down safely in the ocean to the east of the launchpad 99 seconds later. A fuel mixture ratio issue was detected after the flight in one of the eight SuperDraco engines, but did not materially affect the flight. More detailed test results were to be subsequently analyzed by both SpaceX and NASA engineers.

=== Starliner ===
The pad abort test of Boeing's Starliner craft was conducted at 14:15 UTC on November 4, 2019 at the White Sands Missile Range. The capsule was lifted to 1,350 m (4,430 ft) and landed with airbags approximately 90 seconds after liftoff. Though the test was deemed a success, one of three main parachutes failed to deploy properly.

== ISRO pad abort test ==
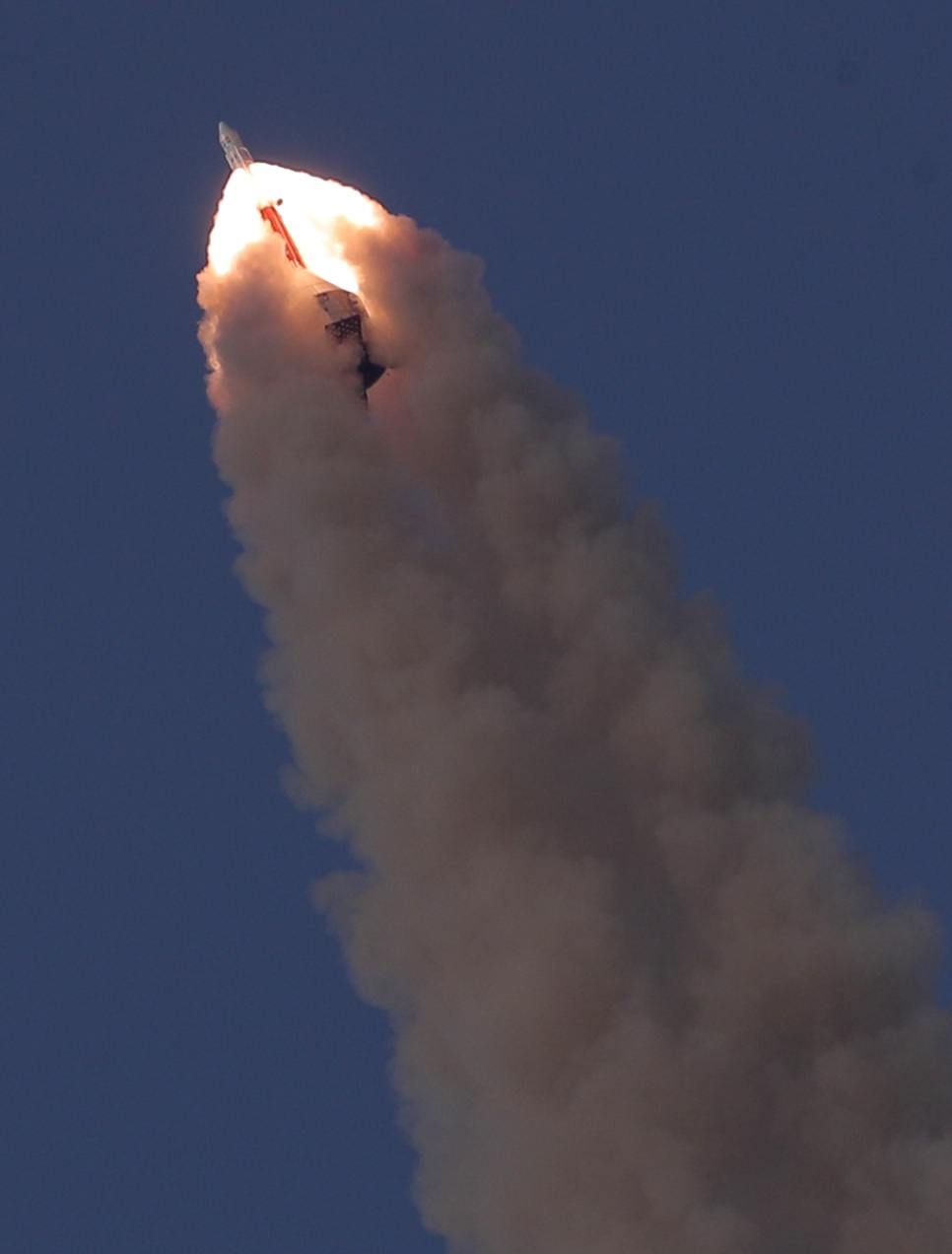
ISRO pad abort test of its crew module as part of Indian human spaceflight programme

On 5 July 2018, Indian Space Research Organisation successfully conducted a pad abort test at Satish Dhawan Space Centre, Sriharikota. A first in a series of tests to qualify a crew escape system.

After a smooth countdown of five hours, the crew escape system, along with the simulated crew module with a mass of 12.6 tonnes, lifted off at 07.00 AM (IST) at the opening of the launch window from its pad at Satish Dhawan Space Centre, Sriharikota. The test was over in 259 seconds, during which the crew escape system along with crew module soared skyward, then arced over the Bay of Bengal and floated back to Earth under its parachutes about 2.9 km from Sriharikota.

== Mengzhou ==
China Manned Space Program included one pad abort test for the Mengzhou spacecraft, called "zero-altitude escape flight test" (Chinese: 零高度逃逸飞行试验), conducted on June 17, 2025 12:30 am BJT from Site 95A of Jiuquan Satellite Launch Center with a successful result.

== See also ==
- Soyuz T-10-1, a Soyuz mission which ended with the use of the launch escape system
