= Little Joe II Qualification Test Vehicle =

First test flight of the Apollo Little Joe II rocket in August 1963

Little Joe II QTV
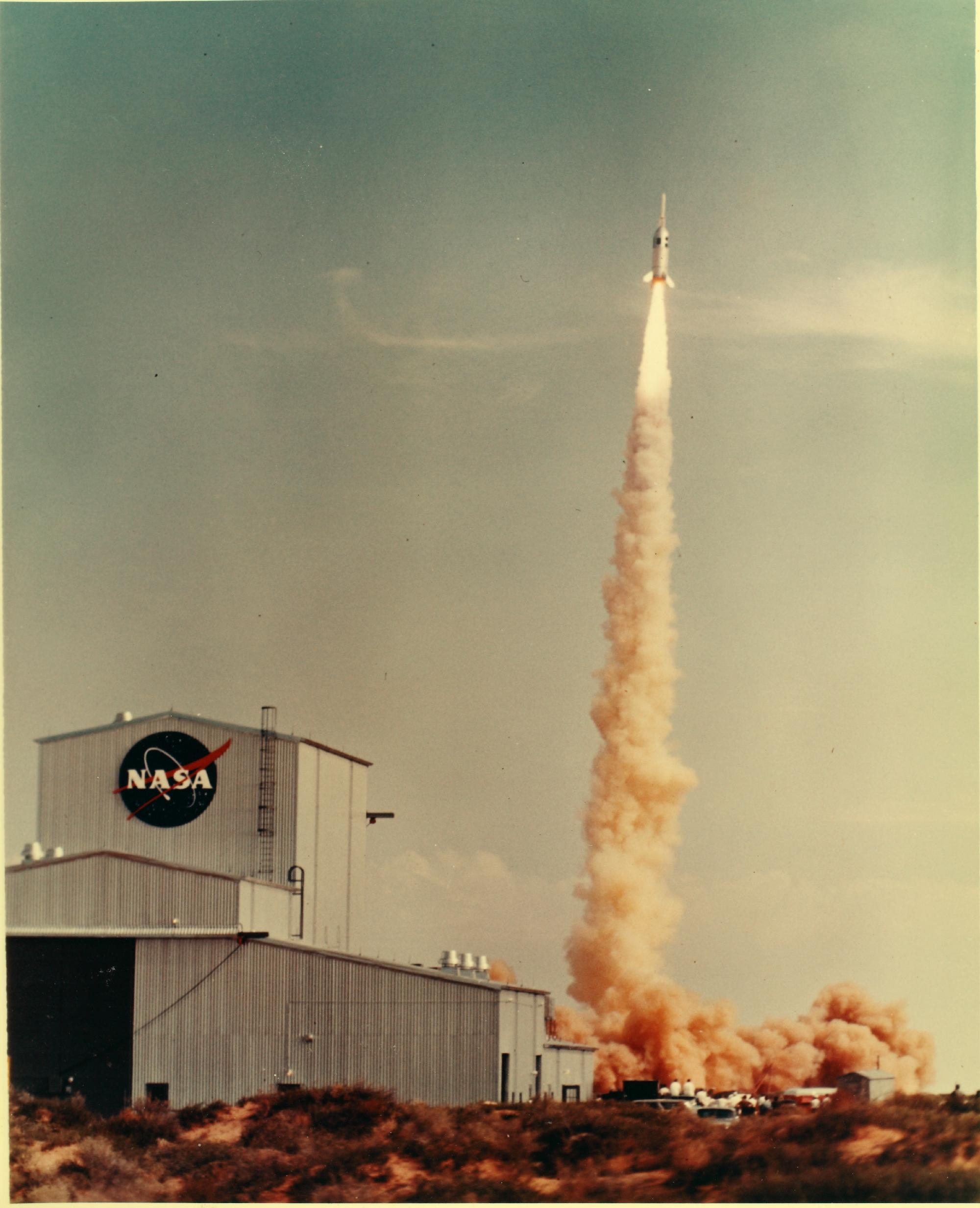
- Mission type: Test flight
- Operator: NASA
- Mission duration: ~5 min
- Distance travelled: 14 kilometers (8.7 mi)
- Apogee: 7.32 kilometers (4.55 mi)

Start of mission
- Launch date: August 28, 1963, 16:00:02 UTC
- Rocket: Little Joe II
- Launch site: White Sands LC-36

End of mission
- Landing date: August 28, 1963
- Project Apollo; Abort Tests

QTV (Qualification Test Vehicle) was the first test flight of the Apollo Little Joe II rocket. It was launched in August 1963.

== Objectives ==
The Little Joe II Qualification Test Vehicle was launched on its first flight from White Sands Missile Range, New Mexico, Area # 3. The mission objectives were to prove the Little Joe II rocket's capability as an Apollo CSM test vehicle and to determine base pressures and heating on the rocket.

== Flight ==
Little Joe II QTV was the first flight of the Little Joe II rockets. It was launched from White Sands Missile Range, New Mexico on August 28, 1963 from Launch Complex 36, Area number 3. The vehicle payload consisted of a simulated command and service module (rather than a boilerplate spacecraft, as used on later test flights) and an inert launch escape system.

Most objectives were achieved. The lone failure was a malfunction in the destruct system.
