= Pad Abort Test 1 =

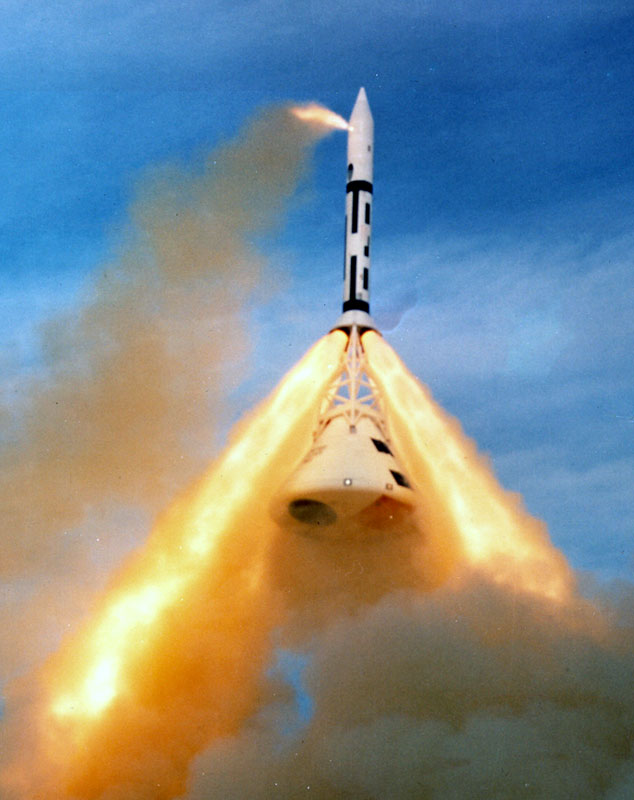
- Pad Abort Test 1 launch.
- Mission type: Abort test
- Operator: NASA
- Mission duration: 2 minutes, 45.1 seconds
- Distance travelled: 2.51 kilometers (1.56 mi)
- Apogee: 2.82 kilometers (1.75 mi)

Spacecraft properties
- Spacecraft: Apollo BP-06

Start of mission
- Launch date: November 7, 1963, 16:00:01 UTC
- Rocket: Apollo LES
- Launch site: White Sands LC-36

End of mission
- Landing date: November 7, 1963, 16:02:45 UTC
- Project Apollo; Abort tests

Pad Abort Test 1 was the first abort test of the Apollo spacecraft on November 7, 1963.

== Objectives ==
Pad Abort Test 1 was a mission to investigate the effects on the Apollo spacecraft during an abort from the pad. The launch escape system (LES) had to be able to pull the spacecraft away from an exploding rocket on the launch pad. The LES then had to gain enough altitude to allow the command module's parachutes to open, preferably with the spacecraft over water and not land.

The flight featured a production model LES and a boilerplate (BP-06) Apollo spacecraft, the first mission to feature one. The spacecraft carried no instruments for measuring structural loads as the capsule's boilerplate structure did not represent that of a real spacecraft.

== Flight ==
On November 7, 1963, an abort signal was sent to the LES at 09:00:01 local time. This began a sequence in which the main solid rockets fired to lift the spacecraft and smaller altitude rockets fired to move it laterally toward the ocean.

The LES separated after 15 seconds, allowing the spacecraft to take a ballistic trajectory. The parachute system worked perfectly: the drogue chute stabilized the spacecraft, then the three main parachutes slowed the descent to a leisurely 26 kilometers per hour.

The only problems found with the flight were that the LES rockets left soot on the spacecraft exterior and the stability of the spacecraft was less than predicted.

== Gallery ==
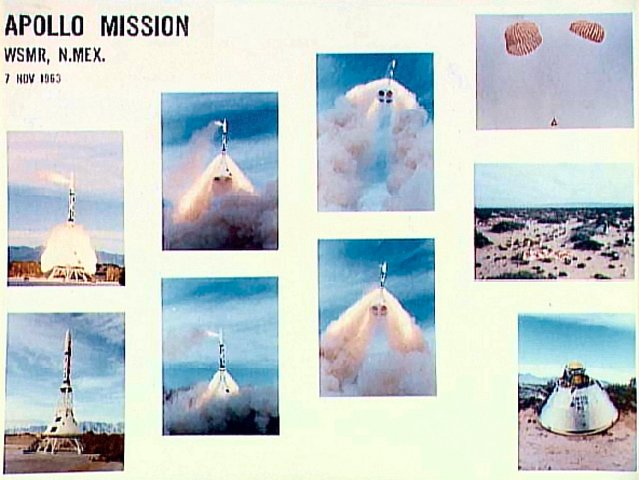
Apollo Pad Abort Test - Nov. 7, 1963 (NASA)
