= White Sands Launch Complex 36 =

American rocket launch site

Coordinates: 32°25′1″N 106°19′19″W

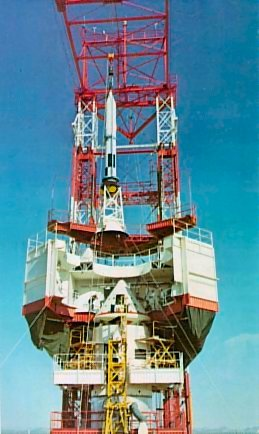
Little Joe II launch pad at the complex

White Sands Launch Complex 36 (LC-36) is a site at White Sands Missile Range used for launches of the Black Brant IX and Black Brant 9CM1. It was also used from May 1964 and January 1966 to launch the Little Joe II rocket for the Apollo Program.

The complex continues to be used as one of the primary launch sites for NASA's sounding rocket program, along with those at Wallops Flight Facility.
