= Apollo 3 =

Apollo 3 may refer to:

- Apollo 3 (band), a German rock band
- AS-203, an uncrewed Saturn IB launch which supported the Apollo program but carried no Apollo spacecraft, intended to be launched third in the series
- AS-202, intended as the second uncrewed Apollo/Saturn IB flight, but launched after AS-203 because of spacecraft delays
- SA-3 (Apollo), the third test flight of the Saturn I rocket and part of Project Highwater

== See also ==
- List of Apollo missions
