= AS-203 =

Uncrewed flight of the Saturn IB rocket, July 5, 1966

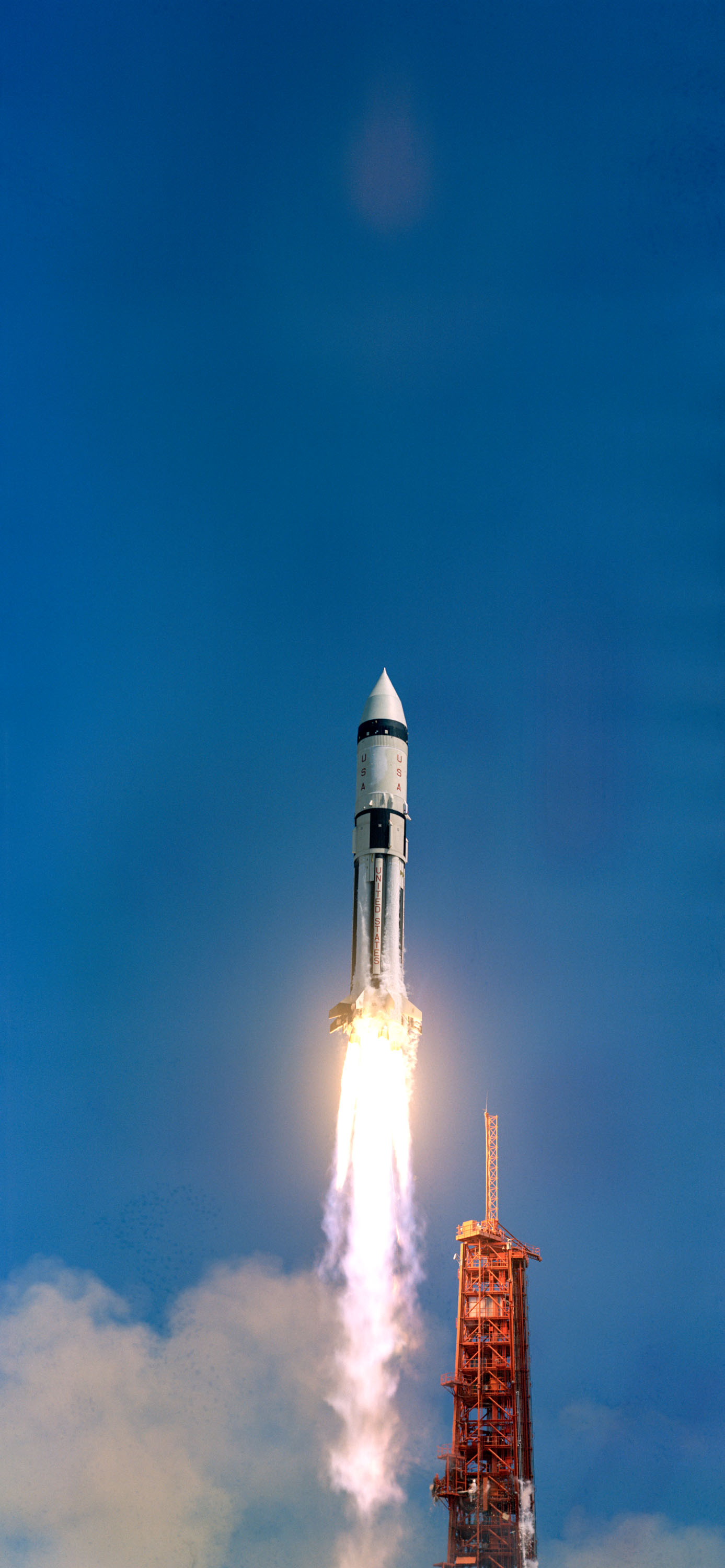
- Launch of AS-203, Cape Kennedy.
- Mission type: Launch vehicle development
- Operator: NASA
- COSPAR ID: 1966-059A
- SATCAT no.: 2289
- Mission duration: ~6 hours
- Distance travelled: 161,900 kilometers (87,400 nmi)
- Orbits completed: 4

Spacecraft properties
- Spacecraft: None

Start of mission
- Launch date: July 5, 1966, 14:53:13 UTC
- Rocket: Saturn IB SA-203
- Launch site: Cape Kennedy LC-37B

End of mission
- Destroyed: July 5, 1966

Orbital parameters
- Reference system: Geocentric
- Regime: Low Earth orbit
- Perigee altitude: 184 kilometers (99 nmi)
- Apogee altitude: 214 kilometers (116 nmi)
- Inclination: 31.94 degrees
- Period: 88.47 minutes
- Epoch: July 5, 1966

AS-203 (also known as SA-203 or Apollo 3) was an uncrewed flight of the Saturn IB rocket on July 5, 1966. It carried no command and service module, as its purpose was to verify the design of the S-IVB rocket stage restart capability that would later be used in the Apollo program to boost astronauts from Earth orbit to a trajectory towards the Moon. It achieved its objectives, but the S-IVB was inadvertently destroyed after four orbits during a differential pressure test that exceeded the design limits.

== Objectives ==
The purpose of the AS-203 flight was to investigate the effects of weightlessness on the liquid hydrogen fuel in the S-IVB-200 second-stage tank. The lunar missions would use a modified version of the S-IVB-200, the S-IVB-500, as the third stage of the Saturn V launch vehicle. This called for the stage to fire briefly to insert the spacecraft into an Earth parking orbit, before restarting the engine for flight to the Moon. In order to design this capability, engineers needed to verify that the anti-slosh measures designed to control the hydrogen's location in the tank were adequate, and that the fuel lines and engines could be kept at the proper temperatures to allow engine restart.

In order to keep residual propellants in the tanks on orbit, there would be no command and service module payload as there was on AS-201 and AS-202, with an aerodynamic nose cone in the place of the payload. Also, the full load of liquid oxygen oxidizer was shorted slightly so that the amount of hydrogen remaining would approximate that of the Saturn V parking orbit. The tank was equipped with 88 sensors and two TV cameras to record the fuel's behavior.

This was also the first launch of a Saturn IB from Pad 37B.

== Preparation ==
In the spring of 1966, the decision was made to launch AS-203 before AS-202, as the CSM that was to be flown on AS-202 was delayed. The S-IVB stage arrived at Cape Kennedy on 6 April 1966; the S-IB first stage arrived six days later, and the Instrument Unit came two days after that.

On April 19, technicians began to erect the booster at Pad 37B. Once again, the testing regimen ran into problems that had plagued AS-201, including cracked solder joints in the printed-circuit boards, requiring over 8,000 to be replaced.

== Flight ==
The rocket launched on the first attempt on July 5. The S-IVB and Instrument Unit (IU) were inserted into a 100-nautical-mile (190 km; 120 mi) circular orbit.

The S-IVB design test objectives were carried out on the first two orbits, and the hydrogen was found to behave mostly as predicted, with sufficient control over its location and of engine temperatures required for restart. The next two orbits were used for extra experiments to obtain information for use in future cryogenic stage designs. These included a free-coast experiment to observe and control the negative acceleration of the fuel caused by the small amount of aerodynamic drag on the vehicle; a rapid fuel tank depressurization test; and a closed fuel tank pressurization test.

Video of the S-IVB separation

The closed fuel tank experiment involved pressurizing the hydrogen tank by closing its vents, while depressurizing the oxygen tank by allowing it to continue venting. It was expected that the pressure difference between the two tanks (measured as high as 39.4 pounds per square inch (272 kPa) would collapse the common bulkhead separating them, as happened in a ground test. The rupture occurred during the two-minute loss of signal between the Manned Spacecraft Center and the Trinidad tracking station. The Trinidad radar image indicated the vehicle was in multiple pieces, and telemetry was never re-acquired. NASA concluded that a spark or impact must have ignited the propellants, causing an explosion.

Despite the destruction of the stage, the mission was classified as a success, having achieved all of its primary objectives and validating the design concept of the restartable S-IVB-500 version. In September Douglas Aircraft Company, which built the S-IVB, declared that the design was ready for use on the Saturn V to send men to the Moon.
