= Strategic Air Command & Aerospace Museum =

Airforce museum in Ashland, Nebraska

Strategic Air Command and Aerospace Museum

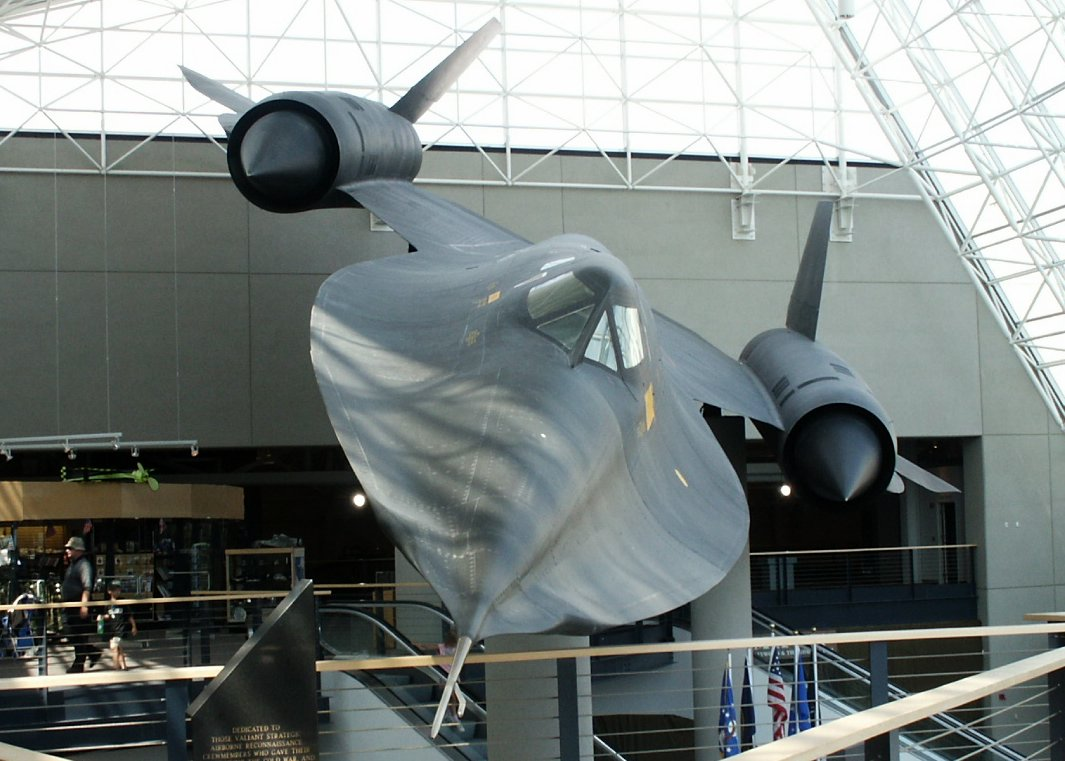
- Lockheed SR-71 Blackbird on display
- Former name: Strategic Aerospace Museum; Strategic Air Command Museum; Strategic Air & Space Museum
- Established: 1959
- Location: Offutt AFB (1959–1998); Ashland, Nebraska (1998-present)
- Coordinates: 41.018026052429384°N 96.32047825278951°W
- Type: Aviation museum
- Founder: Col. A. A. Arnhym
- CEO: Michelle Chartrand
- Website: www.sacmuseum.org

The Strategic Air Command & Aerospace Museum is a museum focusing on aircraft and nuclear missiles of the United States Air Force during the Cold War. It is located near Ashland, Nebraska, along Interstate 80 southwest of Omaha. The objective of the museum is to preserve and display historic aircraft, missiles, and space vehicles, and provide educational resources. The museum was established in 1959 and was originally located on the Offutt Air Force Base.

== History ==
The Strategic Air Command and Aerospace Museum was the vision of Colonel A. A. Arnhym, who frequently spoke about the importance of such a museum. Thomas Power, former commander-in-chief of Strategic Air Command, requested that Colonel Arnhym should ask permission to start the museum. He did so, permission was granted, and the museum was founded in 1959 as the Strategic Air Command Museum.

It was originally located on the Offutt Air Force Base near Bellevue, which was the headquarters of the Strategic Air Command from 1948 to 1992. It began operations with a single airplane as the Strategic Aerospace Museum. In 1970, ownership of the museum was transferred from the Air Force to the State of Nebraska. It was located at the northeast end of retired runway 3/21.

By 1995, the United States Air Force Museum determined that the aircraft had deteriorated and was considering moving them to other locations. Three individuals, Robert Daugherty, Walter Scott Jr. and Lee Seemann, contributed $4 million each as part of a capital campaign for a new museum. Other contributions eventually raised the total to $32 million.

On 16 May 1998, the museum collection was moved indoors, protected from the elements to which it had previously been exposed, at a new facility in Ashland. The site has two buildings containing a total area of 300,000-square-foot (28,000 m^{2}).

In 2001, museum officially became the Strategic Air & Space Museum as part of an increased focus on space, but the name change was unpopular with veterans. On 25 June 2015, the museum announced another name change to the Strategic Air Command & Aerospace Museum.

== Collection ==
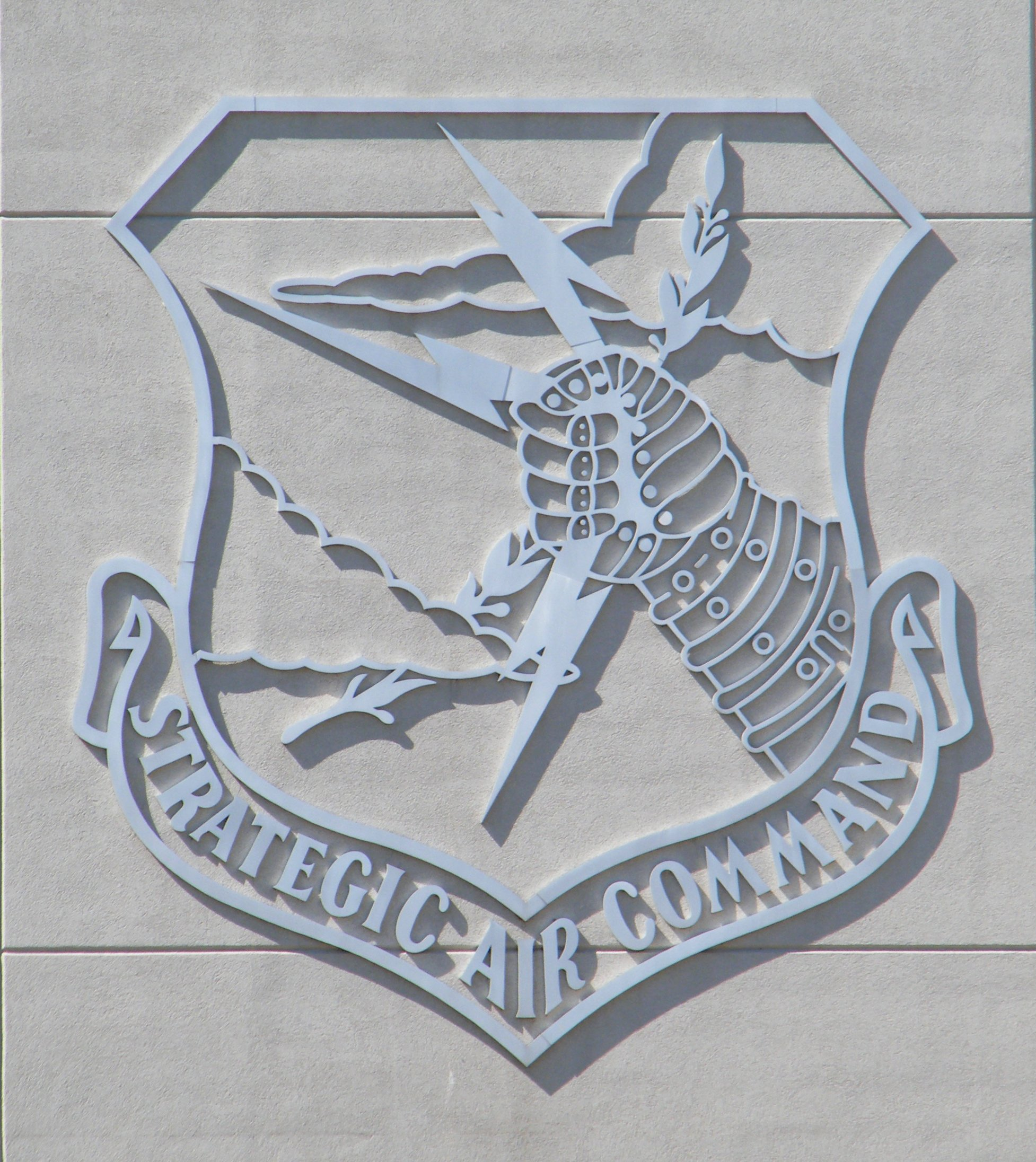
Strategic Air Command shield on exterior of museum

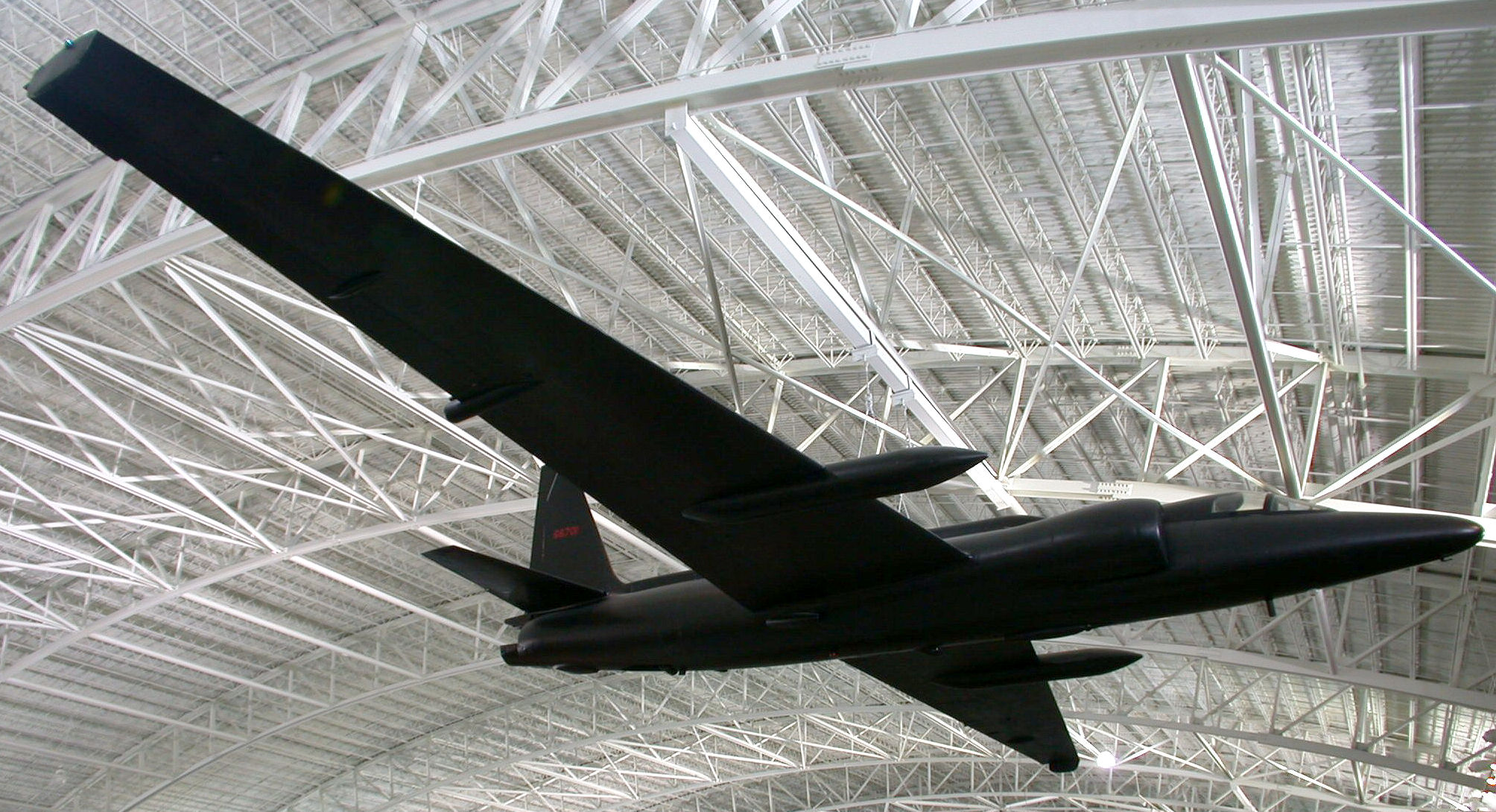
Lockheed U-2C on display

=== Aircraft ===
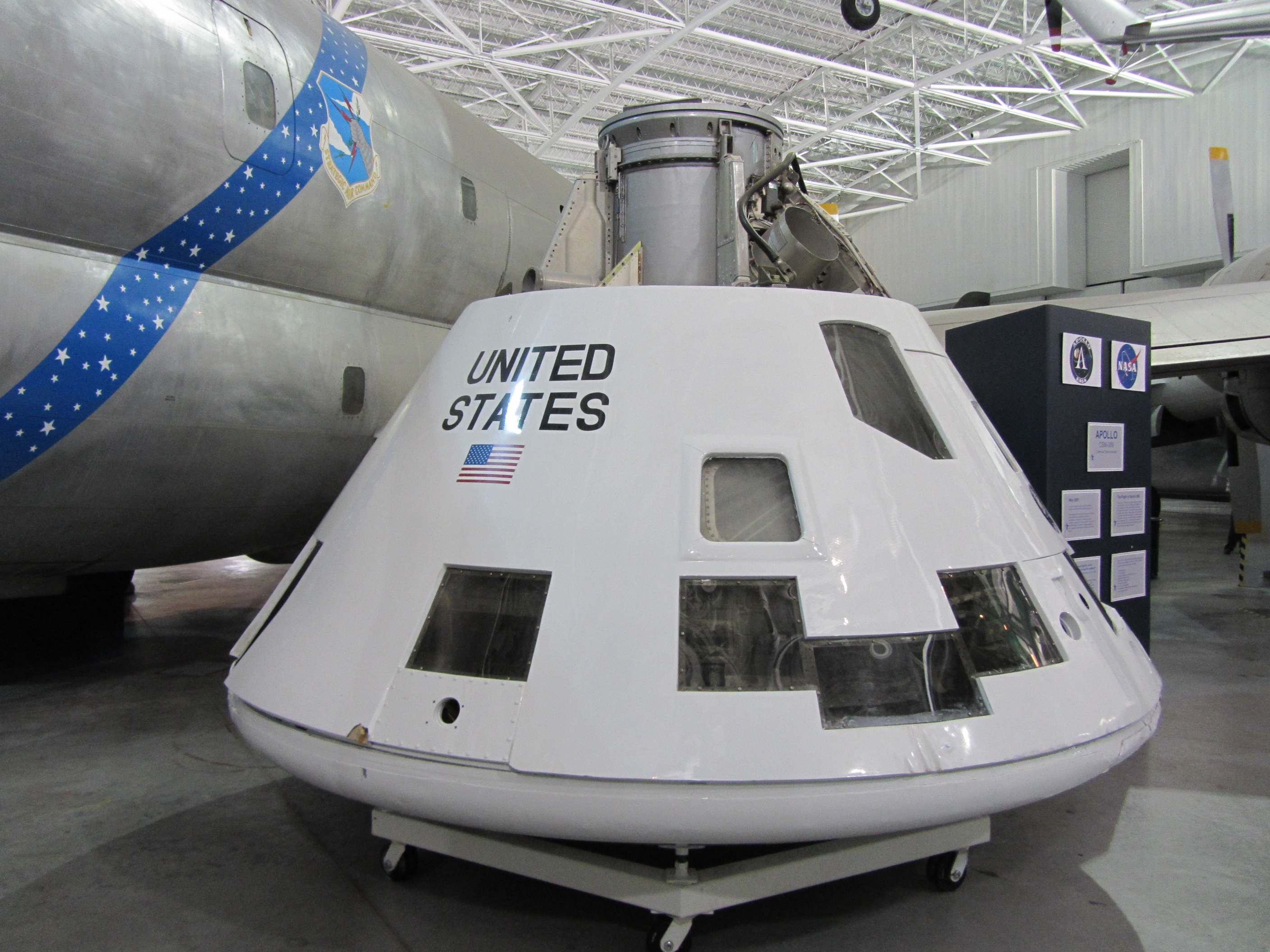
The collection includes the Apollo Block 1 command module from the Apollo program's uncrewed February, 1966, AS-201 mission

- Avro Vulcan B.2 XM573
- Boeing DB-17P Flying Fortress 44-83559 (Configured as a B-17G of the 96th Bomb Group)
- Boeing B-47E Stratojet 52-1412
- Boeing EC-135C 63-8049
- Boeing KC-97G Stratofreighter 53-0198
- Boeing RB-52B Stratofortress 52-8711
- Boeing TB-29 Superfortress 44-84076
- Convair B-36J 52-2217
- Convair B-58A Hustler 61-2059
- Convair F-102A Delta Dagger 54-1405
- Convair T-29A 50-0190
- Douglas A-26B Invader 44-34665
- Douglas C-47A Skytrain 43-48098
- Douglas C-54D Skymaster 42-72724
- Fairchild C-119G Flying Boxcar 51-8024L
- General Atomics MQ-1C Gray Eagle 07-0110
- General Dynamics FB-111A Aardvark 68-0267
- Grumman HU-16B Albatross 51-0006
- Lockheed F-117 Nighthawk 85-0831
- Lockheed T-33A 58-0548
- Lockheed U-2C 56-6701
- Lockheed SR-71A Blackbird 61-7964
- Martin B-57E Canberra 55-4244
- McDonnell XF-85 Goblin 46-0524
- McDonnell F-101B Voodoo 59-0462
- McDonnell RF-4C Phantom II 65-0903
- Mikoyan-Gurevich MiG-21F-13 60-2105
- Mikoyan-Gurevich MiG-23 #0390324630 Marked as "Red 338" in East German Air Forces of the National People's Army service.
- North American JTB-25N Mitchell 44-30363
- North American TB-25N Mitchell 44-28738 – Fuselage only
- North American F-86H Sabre 53-1375
- North American RB-45C Tornado 48-0017
- North American T-39A Sabreliner 62-4487
- Piasecki CH-21B 52-8676
- Republic F-84F Thunderstreak 51-1714
- Republic F-105D Thunderchief 61-0069 – Located at I-80W Mile Marker 428.2
- Rockwell B-1A Lancer 76-0174
- Sikorsky H-19B Chickasaw 53-4426

=== Rockets and missiles ===
- Boeing AGM-86B ALCM
- Chance Vought SLV-1 Blue Scout
- Convair SM-65D Atlas
- Douglas PGM-17A Thor
- McDonnell GAM-72 Quail
- Northrop SM-62 Snark
- North American GAM-77 Hound Dog

=== Spacecraft ===
- Apollo Block I Command Module CSM-009 – Flown on AS-201
- Apollo Boilerplate Command Module
- NASA X-38
- Project Vela Satellite
