= Fire in the hole =

Colloquial saying

"Fire in the hole" is an expression indicating that an explosive detonation is imminent. It originated from American miners, who needed to warn their fellows that a charge had been set. The phrase appears in this sense in American state mining regulations, in military and corporate procedures, and in various mining and military blasting-related print books and narratives, e.g. during bomb disposal or throwing grenades into a confined space.

In common parlance it has become a catchphrase for a warning of the type "Watch out!" or "Heads up!".

NASA has used the term to describe a means of staging a multistage rocket vehicle by igniting the upper stage simultaneously with the ejection of the lower stage, without a usual delay of several seconds. On the Apollo 5 uncrewed flight test of the first Apollo Lunar Module, a "fire in the hole test" used this procedure to simulate a lunar landing abort. Gene Kranz describes the test in his autobiography:

The fire-in-the-hole test involved shutting down the descent rocket, blowing the bolts that attached the ascent and descent stages, switching control and power to the ascent stage, and igniting the ascent rocket while still nestled to the landing stage.

— Gene Kranz, Failure Is Not an Option
