= AS-202 =

Uncrewed test flight of the Apollo Program

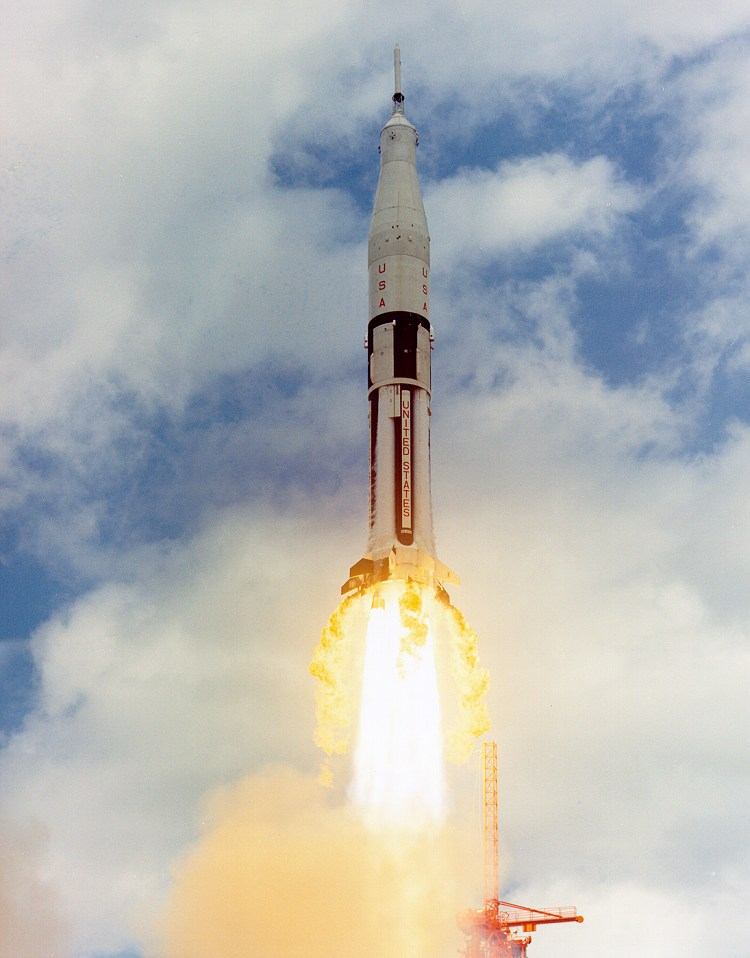
- Launch of AS-202
- Mission type: Suborbital test flight
- Operator: NASA
- Mission duration: 1 hour, 33 minutes, 2 seconds
- Range: 25,700 kilometers (13,900 nautical miles)
- Apogee: 1,142.9 kilometers (617.1 nautical miles)

Spacecraft properties
- Spacecraft: Apollo CSM-011
- Manufacturer: North American Aviation
- Launch mass: 20,091 kilograms (44,294 lb)

Start of mission
- Launch date: August 25, 1966, 17:15:32 UTC
- Rocket: Saturn IB
- Launch site: Cape Kennedy LC-34

End of mission
- Recovered by: USS Hornet
- Landing date: August 25, 1966, 18:48:34 UTC
- Landing site: North Pacific Ocean; 16°07′N 168°54′E

AS-202 (also referred to as SA-202 or Apollo 2) was the second uncrewed, suborbital test flight of a production Block I Apollo command and service module launched with the Saturn IB launch vehicle. It was launched on August 25, 1966, and was the first flight which included the spacecraft guidance, navigation control system and fuel cells. The success of this flight enabled the Apollo program to judge the Block I spacecraft and Saturn IB ready to carry men into orbit on the next mission, AS-204.

== Objectives ==
AS-202 was the third test flight of the Saturn IB, because a delay in the readiness of the Apollo spacecraft 011 pushed its launch past the July 1966 launch of AS-203. It was designed to test the rocket more than had been done on AS-201 by launching the rocket higher and having the flight lasting twice as long. It would also test the command and service module (CSM-011) by having the engine fire four times during the flight.

The flight was also designed to test the heat shield by subjecting it to 260 megajoules per square meter. Over the course of the reentry it generated equivalent energy needed to power Los Angeles for over one minute in 1966.

CSM-011 was basically a production model capable of carrying a crew. However it lacked the crew couches and some displays that would be included on later missions for the astronauts. This was the first flight of the guidance and navigation system as well as the fuel cell electrical system.

== Flight ==
Stage-separation of S-IVB, ground-camera view.

AS-202 was launched 25 August 1966 from Pad 34. The launch phase was nominal, with the first stage burning for just under two and a half minutes and lifting the rocket to an altitude of 31.4 nautical miles (58.2 km), 30.4 nautical miles (56.3 km) downrange from the launch pad. The second stage then burned for a further seven and a half minutes, putting the spacecraft into a ballistic trajectory. The CSM was separated from the rocket stage at an altitude of 419.8 nautical miles (777.5 km).

The CSM was preprogrammed to make four burns of its service propulsion system (SPS). The first occurred a couple of seconds after separation from the S-IVB second stage. It burned for 3 minutes, 35 seconds, lifting the spacecraft apogee to 617.1 nautical miles (1,142.9 km), 874.8 nautical miles (1,620.1 km) downrange.

The second burn was 25 minutes later, lasting one minute 28 seconds. Ten seconds later, two more burns of three seconds each were done to test the rapid restart capabilities of the engine.

The command module entered the atmosphere at a speed of 28,512 feet per second (8,690 m/s). The spacecraft performed a skip reentry, first descending to 36 nautical miles (67 km), then lifting back up to 44 nautical miles (81 km). By this time it had shed 4,300 feet per second (1,300 m/s) of speed. It then continued to descend. The main parachutes deployed at 23,790 feet (7,250 m). It splashed down at 16.12°N 168.9°E, 205 nautical miles (380 km) from the target landing site, and the aircraft carrier USS Hornet took 8 hours and 30 minutes to reach the capsule (approximately 230 nautical miles [430 km] southeast of Wake Island).

== Staging footage ==
Footage showing the separation of two stages of the Saturn IB rocket. The S-IVB pulls away from the spent S-IB, and the latter falls to Earth.

AS-202 was one of three uncrewed Apollo missions which obtained notable close-up footage of a Saturn rocket during staging, the others being Apollo 4 and Apollo 6. Ejectable cameras were mounted to each launch vehicle, technology first developed for the Saturn I. On AS-202, a camera was mounted to the Saturn IB vehicle's first stage, the S-IB, looking forward. It captured footage of the vehicle's second stage, the S-IVB (200 series) pulling away and firing its single J-2 engine. The upper stage is identifiable by its firing of three ullage motors; a later iteration of the S-IVB, the 500 series, had only two ullage motors, and was that used on Saturn V launches.

Although the footage was captured during an uncrewed flight, it is frequently used as stock footage in documentaries of crewed flights, to illustrate staging. The footage was used in the documentary film Apollo 11, and is sometimes erroneously attributed to Apollo 11, or other crewed missions.

== Museum display ==
The capsule was displayed in the US Pavilion at Expo 67 in Montreal. The capsule is currently on display aboard USS Hornet. The ship is open to the public as the USS Hornet Museum in Alameda, California.

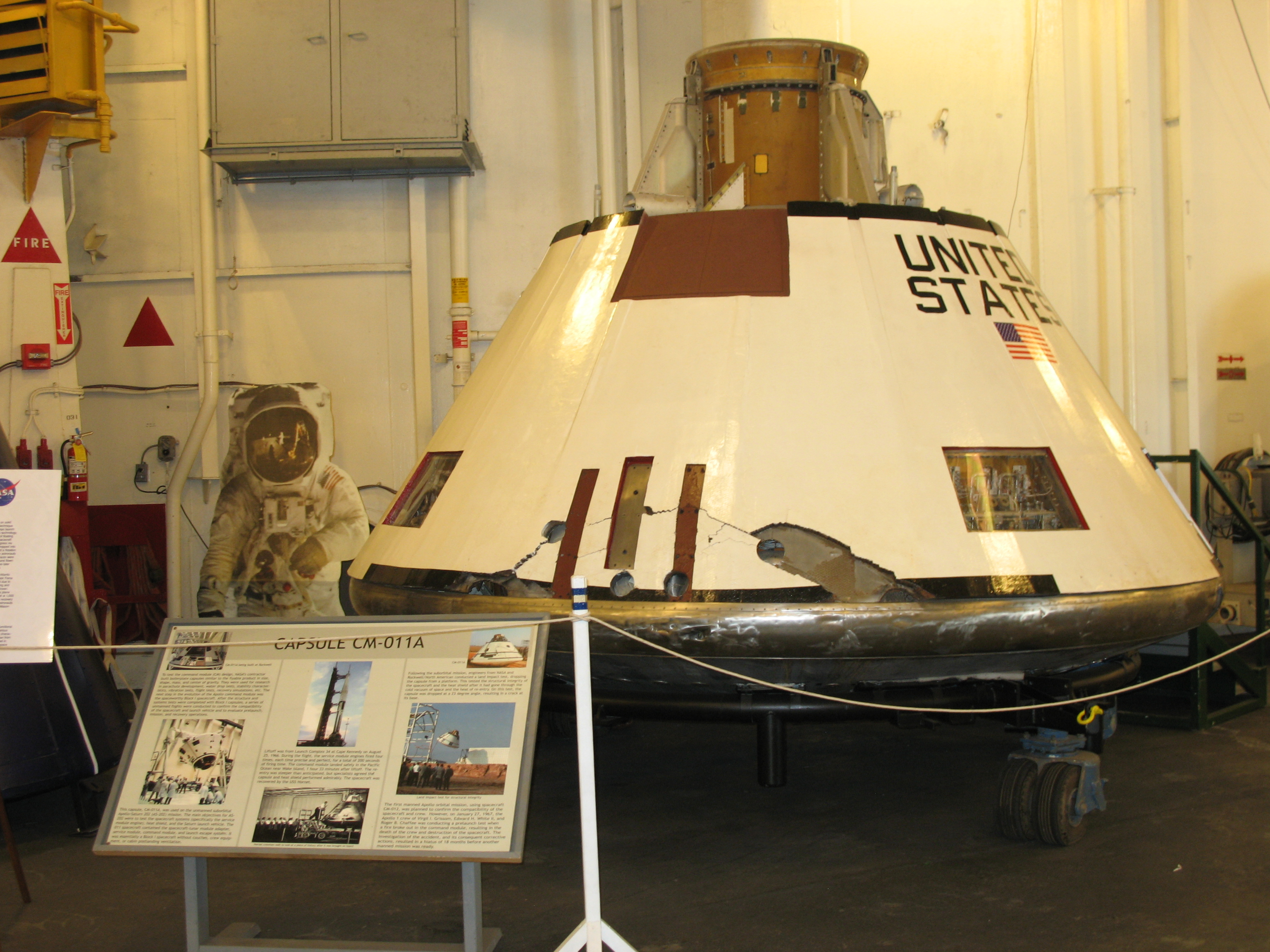
AS-202 CM-011 exhibited on USS Hornet

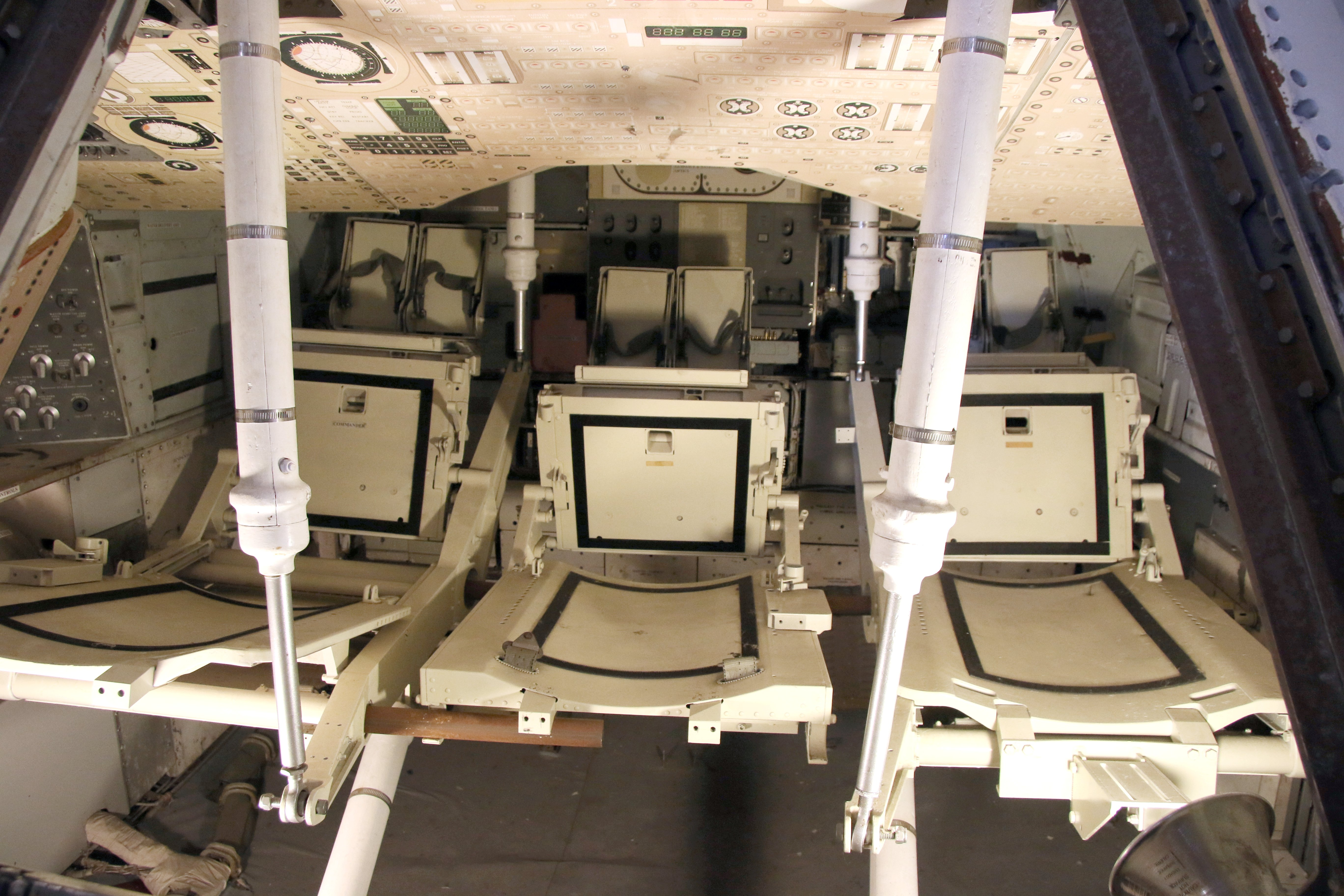
AS-202 CM-011 interior
