= Saturn IB =

American expendable rocket used in the Apollo program during the 1960s and 70s

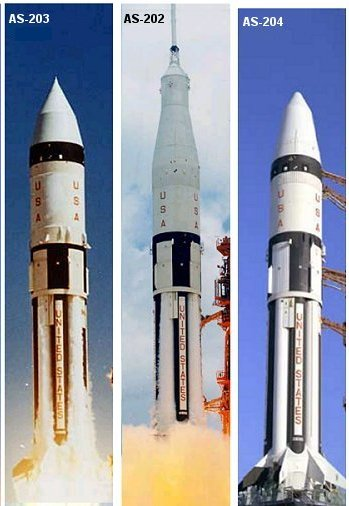
- Three launch configurations of the Apollo Saturn IB rocket: no spacecraft (AS-203), command and service module (AS-202), and Lunar Module (Apollo 5)
- Function: Apollo spacecraft development; S-IVB stage development in support of Saturn V; Skylab crew launcher
- Manufacturer: Chrysler (S-IB); Douglas (S-IVB)
- Country of origin: United States

Size
- Height: 141.6 ft (43.2 m) without payload
- Diameter: 21.67 ft (6.61 m)
- Mass: 1,300,220 lb (589,770 kg) without payload
- Stages: 2

Capacity

Payload to LEO
- Altitude: 87.5 nmi (162.1 km; 100.7 mi)
- Mass: 21,000 kg (46,000 lb)

Launch history
- Status: Retired
- Launch sites: Cape Canaveral, LC-34 and LC-37; Kennedy, LC-39B
- Total launches: 9
- Success(es): 9
- First flight: February 26, 1966
- Last flight: July 15, 1975
- Carries passengers or cargo: Apollo CSM, Uncrewed Apollo LM

First stage – S-IB
- Height: 24.44 m (80.17 ft)
- Diameter: 6.53 m (21.42 ft)
- Empty mass: 42,000 kg (92,500 lb)
- Gross mass: 441,000 kg (973,000 lb)
- Propellant mass: 399,400 kg (880,500 lb)
- Powered by: 8 × H-1
- Maximum thrust: 7,100 kN (1,600,000 lbf)
- Specific impulse: 272 s (2.67 km/s)
- Burn time: 150 seconds
- Propellant: LOX / RP-1

Second stage – S-IVB
- Height: 17.81 m (58.42 ft)
- Diameter: 6.53 m (21.42 ft)
- Empty mass: 10,600 kg (23,400 lb)
- Gross mass: 114,300 kg (251,900 lb)
- Propellant mass: 103,600 kg (228,500 lb)
- Powered by: 1 × J-2
- Maximum thrust: 890 kN (200,000 lbf)
- Specific impulse: 420 s (4.1 km/s)
- Burn time: 480 seconds
- Propellant: LOX / LH_{2}

The Saturn IB (Note: Pronounced "one bee") (also known as the uprated Saturn I) was an American launch vehicle commissioned by the National Aeronautics and Space Administration (NASA) for the Apollo program. It uprated the Saturn I by replacing the S-IV second stage (90,000 pounds-force [400 kN], 43,380,000 lb-sec total impulse), with the S-IVB (200,000 pounds-force [890 kN], 96,000,000 lb-sec total impulse). The S-IB first stage also increased the S-I baseline's thrust from 1,500,000 to 1,600,000 pounds-force (6,700 to 7,100 kN) and propellant load by 3.1%. This increased the Saturn I's low Earth orbit payload capability from 20,000 to 46,000 pounds (9.1 to 20.9 t), enough for early flight tests of a half-fueled Apollo command and service module (CSM) or a fully fueled Apollo Lunar Module (LM), before the larger Saturn V needed for lunar flight was ready.

By sharing the S-IVB upper stage, the Saturn IB and Saturn V provided a common interface to the Apollo spacecraft. The only major difference was that the S-IVB on the Saturn V burned only part of its propellant to achieve Earth orbit, so it could be restarted for trans-lunar injection. The S-IVB on the Saturn IB needed all of its propellant to achieve Earth orbit.

The Saturn IB launched two uncrewed CSM suborbital flights to a height of 162 km, one uncrewed LM orbital flight, and the first crewed CSM orbital mission (first planned as Apollo 1, later flown as Apollo 7). It also launched one orbital mission, AS-203, without a payload so the S-IVB would have residual liquid hydrogen fuel. This mission supported the design of the restartable version of the S-IVB used in the Saturn V, by observing the behavior of the liquid hydrogen in weightlessness.

In 1973, the year after the Apollo lunar program ended, three Apollo CSM/Saturn IBs ferried crews to the Skylab space station. In 1975, one last Apollo/Saturn IB launched the Apollo portion of the joint US-USSR Apollo–Soyuz Test Project (ASTP). A backup Apollo CSM/Saturn IB was assembled and readied for a Skylab rescue mission, but never flown.

The remaining Saturn IBs in NASA's inventory were scrapped after the ASTP mission, as no use could be found for them and all heavy lift needs of the US space program could be serviced by the cheaper and more versatile Titan III family and the Space Shuttle.

== History ==
"The Saturn IB Story 1966" - Official NASA promotional information film reel.

In 1959, NASA's Silverstein Committee issued recommendations to develop the Saturn class launch vehicles, growing from the C-1. When the Apollo program was started in 1961 with the goal of landing men on the Moon, NASA chose the Saturn I for Earth orbital test missions. However, the Saturn I's payload limit of 20,000 pounds (9,100 kg) to 162 km would allow testing of only the command module with a smaller propulsion module attached, as the command and service module would have a dry weight of at least 26,300 pounds (11,900 kg), in addition to service propulsion and reaction control fuel. In July 1962, NASA announced selection of the C-5 for the lunar landing mission, and decided to develop another launch vehicle by upgrading the Saturn I, replacing its S-IV second stage with the S-IVB, which would also be modified for use as the Saturn V third stage. The S-I first stage would also be upgraded to the S-IB by improving the thrust of its engines and removing some weight. The new Saturn IB, with a payload capability of at least 35,000 pounds (16,000 kg), would replace the Saturn I for Earth orbit testing, allowing the command and service module to be flown with a partial fuel load. It would also allow launching the 32,000-pound (15,000 kg) lunar excursion module separately for uncrewed and crewed Earth orbital testing, before the Saturn V was ready to be flown. It would also give early development to the third stage.

On May 12, 1966, NASA announced the vehicle would be called the "uprated Saturn I", at the same time the "lunar excursion module" was renamed the lunar module. However, the "uprated Saturn I" terminology was reverted to Saturn IB on December 2, 1967.

By the time it was developed, the Saturn IB payload capability had increased to 41,000 pounds (19,000 kg). By 1973, when it was used to launch three Skylab missions, the first-stage engine had been upgraded further, raising the payload capability to 46,000 pounds (21,000 kg).

== Specifications ==
=== Launch vehicle ===
Parameter	S-IB (1st stage)	S-IVB (2nd stage)	Instrument unit
Height	24.44 m (80.17 ft)	17.81 m (58.42 ft)	0.91 m (3 ft)
Diameter	6.53 m (21.42 ft)	6.61 m (21.67 ft)	6.61 m (21.67 ft)
Structural mass	42,000 kg (92,500 lb)	10,600 kg (23,400 lb)	2,000 kg (4,400 lb)
Propellant	LOX / RP-1	LOX / LH_{2}	—N/a
Propellant mass	399,400 kg (880,500 lb)	103,600 kg (228,500 lb)	—N/a
Engines	8 × H-1	1 × J-2	—N/a
Thrust	7,100 kN (1,600,000 lbf) sea level	890 kN (200,000 lbf) vacuum	—N/a
Burn duration	150 seconds	480 seconds	—N/a
Specific impulse	272 s (2.67 km/s) sea level	420 s (4.1 km/s) vacuum	—N/a
Contractor	Chrysler	Douglas	IBM

=== Payload configurations ===
Parameter	Command and service module	Apollo 5	AS-203
Launch Escape System mass	4,200 kg (9,200 lb)	—N/a	—N/a
Apollo command and service module mass	16,500 to 20,900 kg (36,400 to 46,000 lb)	—N/a	—N/a
Apollo Lunar Module mass	—N/a	14,360 kg (31,650 lb)	—N/a
Spacecraft–LM adapter mass	1,840 kg (4,050 lb)	1,840 kg (4,050 lb)	—N/a
Nose cone height	—N/a	2.5 m (8.3 ft)	8.4 m (27.7 ft)
Payload height	24.9 m (81.8 ft)	11.1 m (36.3 ft)	—N/a
Total space vehicle height	68.1 m (223.4 ft)	54.2 m (177.9 ft)	51.6 m (169.4 ft)

=== S-IB first stage ===
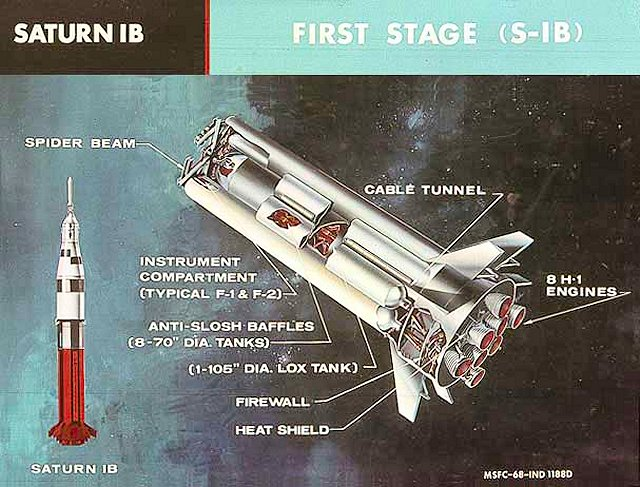
Diagram of the S-IB first stage of the Saturn IB rocket

The S-IB stage was built by the Chrysler corporation at the Michoud Assembly Facility, New Orleans. It was powered by eight Rocketdyne H-1 rocket engines burning RP-1 fuel with liquid oxygen (LOX). Eight Redstone tanks (four holding fuel and four holding LOX) were clustered around a Jupiter rocket LOX tank, which earned the rocket the nickname "Cluster's Last Stand". The four outboard engines were mounted on gimbals, allowing them to be steered to control the rocket. Eight fins surrounding the base thrust structure provided aerodynamic stability and control.

Data from:

General characteristics

- Length: 24.44 metres (80.17 ft)
- Diameter: 6.53 metres (21.42 ft)
- Wingspan: 12.02 metres (39.42 ft)

Engine

- 8 × Rocketdyne H-1
  - Thrust: 7,100 kilonewtons (1,600,000 lbf)
  - Burn time: 150 seconds
  - Fuel: LOX / RP-1

=== S-IVB second stage ===
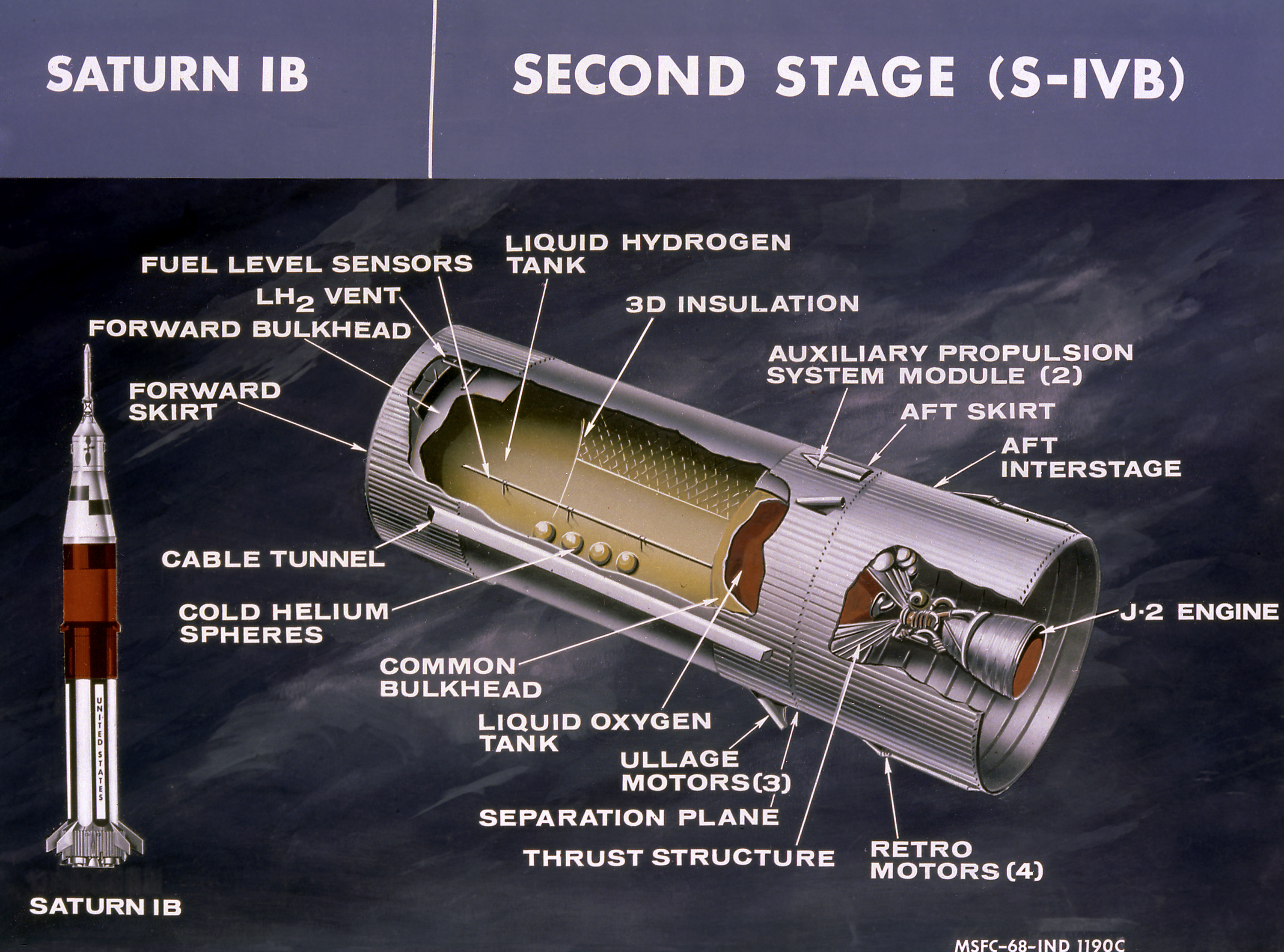
Diagram of the S-IVB second stage of the Saturn IB

The S-IVB was built by the Douglas Aircraft Company at Huntington Beach, California. The S-IVB-200 model was similar to the S-IVB-500 third stage used on the Saturn V, with the exception of the interstage adapter, smaller auxiliary propulsion control modules, and lack of on-orbit engine restart capability. It was powered by a single Rocketdyne J-2 engine. The fuel and oxidizer tanks shared a common bulkhead, which saved about ten tons of weight and reduced vehicle length over ten feet.

General characteristics

- Length: 17.81 metres (58.42 ft)
- Diameter: 6.61 metres (21.67 ft)

Engine

- 1 × Rocketdyne J-2
  - Thrust: 890 kilonewtons (200,000 lbf)
  - Burn time: ~420 seconds
  - Fuel: LOX / LH_{2}

== Instrument unit ==
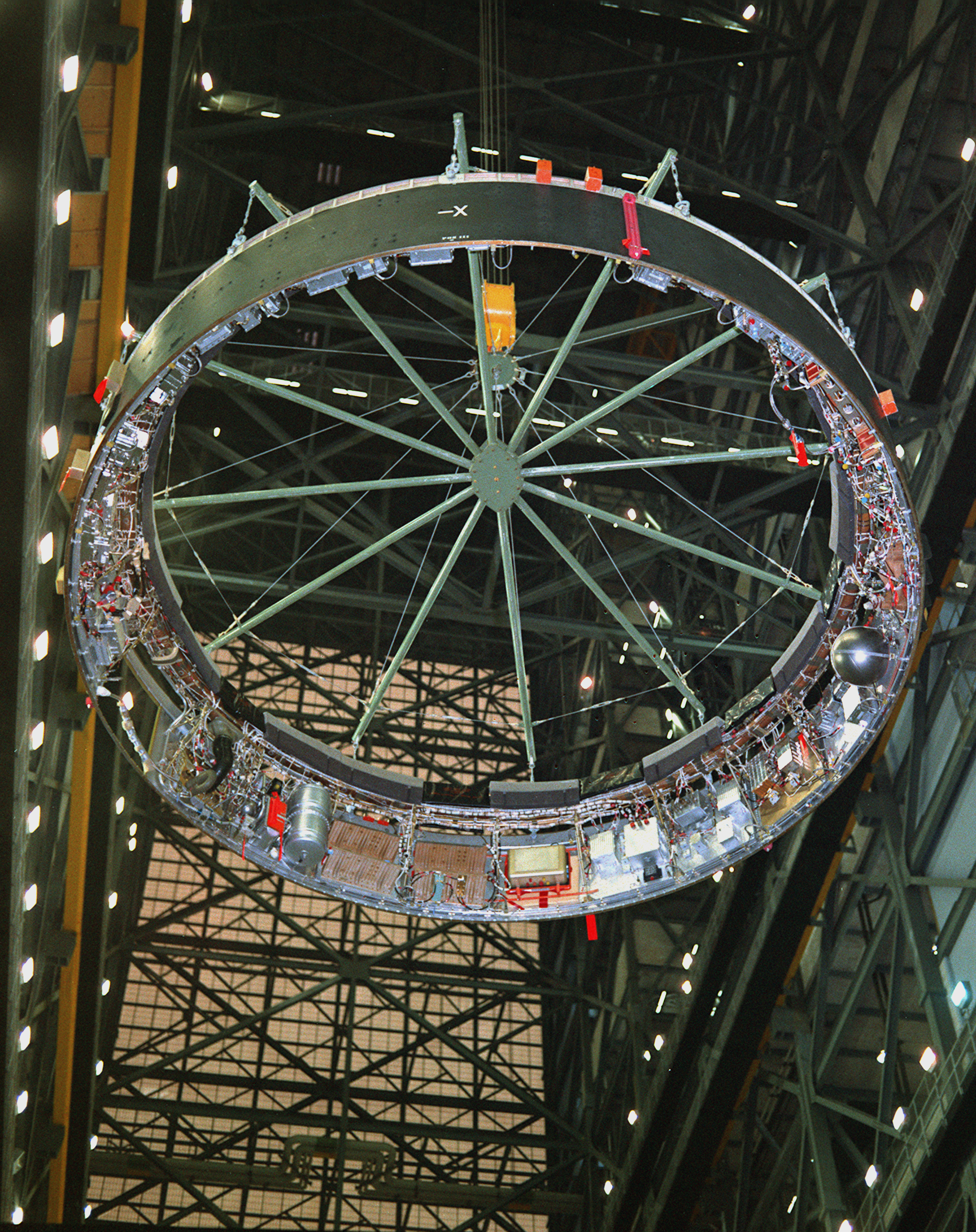
The instrument unit, which controlled the Saturn IB and Saturn V

IBM built the instrument unit at the Space Systems Center in Huntsville, Alabama. Located at the top of the S-IVB stage, it consisted of a Launch Vehicle Digital Computer (LVDC), an inertial platform, accelerometers, a tracking, telemetry and command system and associated environmental controls. It controlled the entire rocket from just before liftoff until battery depletion. Like other rocket guidance systems, it maintained its state vector (position and velocity estimates) by integrating accelerometer measurements, sent firing and steering commands to the main engines and auxiliary thrusters, and fired the appropriate ordnance and solid rocket motors during staging and payload separation events.

As with other rockets, a completely independent and redundant range safety system could be invoked by ground radio command to terminate thrust and to destroy the vehicle should it malfunction and threaten people or property on the ground. In the Saturn IB and V, the range safety system was permanently disabled by ground command after safely reaching orbit. This was done to ensure that the S-IVB stage would not inadvertently rupture and create a cloud of debris in orbit that could endanger the crew of the Apollo CSM.

== Launch sequence events ==
Launch event	Time (s)	Altitude (km)	Speed (m/s)
Guidance reference release	−5.0	0.09	0
First motion	0.0	0.09	0
Mach 1	58.9	7.4	183
Maximum dynamic pressure	73.6	12.4	328
Freeze tilt	130.5	48.2	1587
Inboard engine cutoff	137.6	54.8	1845
Outboard engine cutoff	140.6	57.6	1903
S-IB / S-IVB separation	142.0	59.0	1905
S-IVB ignition	143.4	59.9	1900
Ullage case jettison	154.0	69.7	1914
Launch escape tower jettison	165.6	79.5	1960
Iterative guidance mode initiation	171.0	83.7	1984
Engine mixture ratio shift	469.5	164.8	5064
Guidance cutoff signal	581.9	158.4	7419
Orbit insertion	591.9	158.5	7426

Acceleration of the Saturn IB increased from 1.24 G at liftoff to a maximum of 4.35 G at the end of the S-IB stage burn, and increased again from 0 G to 2.85 G from stage separation to the end of the S-IVB burn.

AS-206, 207, and 208 inserted the Command and Service Module in a 150-by-222-kilometer (81-by-120-nautical-mile) elliptical orbit which was co-planar with the Skylab one. The SPS engine of the Command and Service Module was used at orbit apogee to achieve a Hohmann transfer to the Skylab orbit at 431 kilometers (233 nautical miles).

== Saturn IB vehicles and launches ==
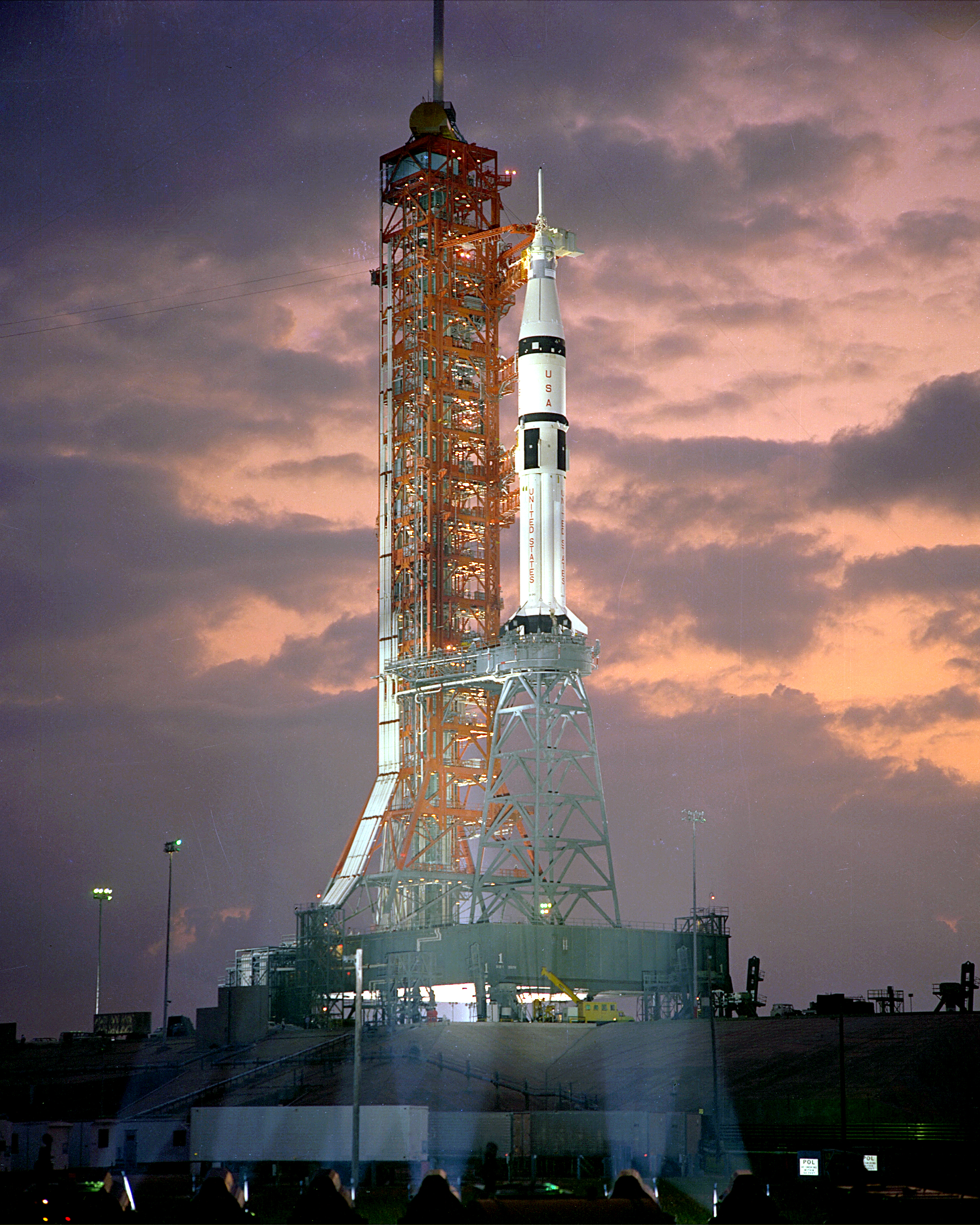
Saturn IB mounted on the "milkstool" platform

The first five Saturn IB launches for the Apollo program were made from LC-34 and LC-37, Cape Kennedy Air Force Station.

The Saturn IB was used between 1973 and 1975 for three crewed Skylab flights, and one Apollo–Soyuz Test Project flight. This final production run did not have alternating black and white S-IB stage tanks, or vertical stripes on the S-IVB aft tank skirt, which were present on the earlier vehicles. Since LC-34 and 37 were inactive by then, these launches utilized Kennedy Space Center's LC-39B. Mobile Launcher Platform No. 1 was modified, adding an elevated platform known as the "milkstool" to accommodate the height differential between the Saturn IB and the much larger Saturn V. This enabled alignment of the Launch Umbilical Tower's access arms to accommodate crew access, fueling, and ground electrical connections for the Apollo spacecraft and S-IVB upper stage. The tower's second stage access arms were modified to service the S-IB first stage.

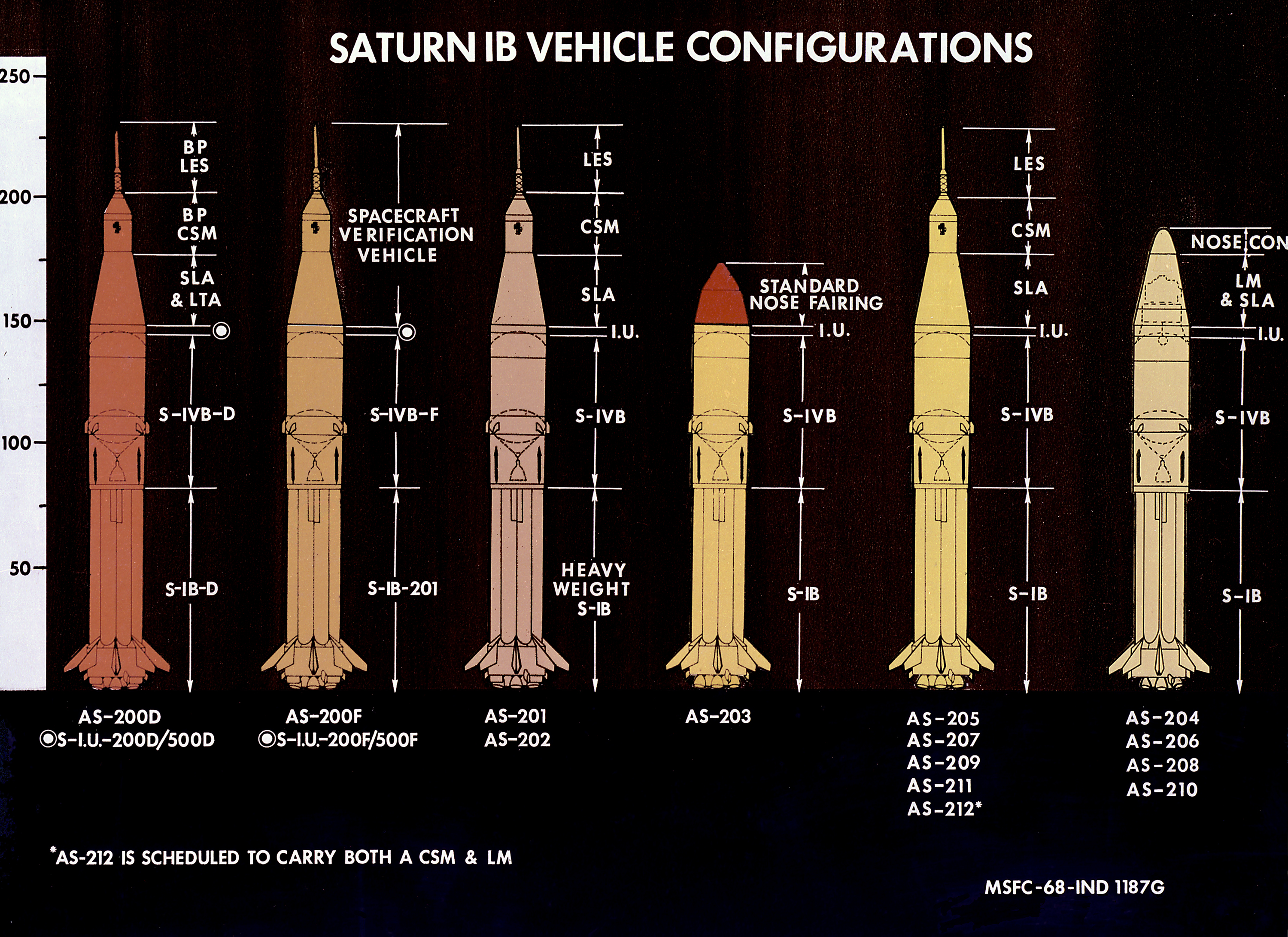
Various mission configurations for the Saturn IB launch vehicle.

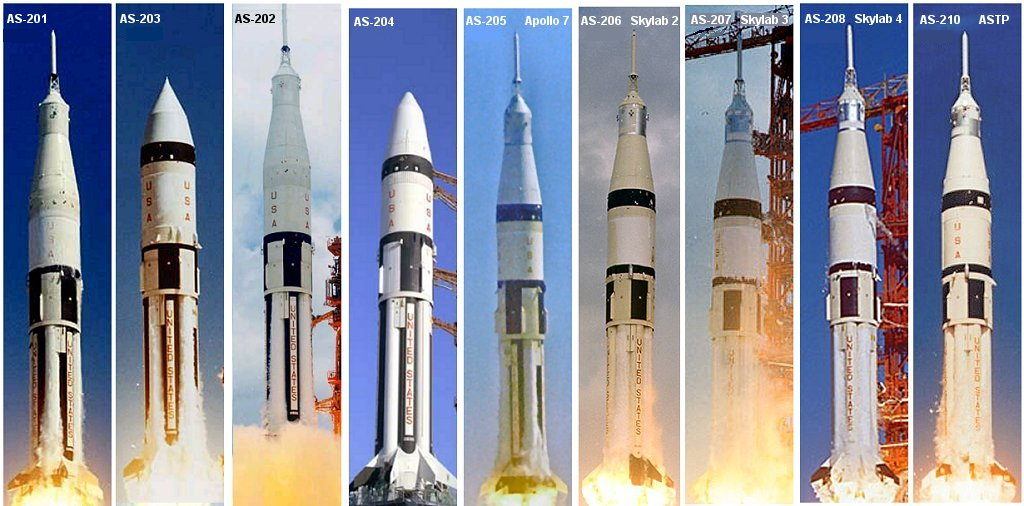
All Saturn IB launches from AS-201 through ASTP.

Serial number	Launch date (UTC)	Launch site	Mission	Spacecraft mass (kg)	Notes
SA-201	February 26, 1966; 16:12:01	Cape Kennedy, LC-34	AS-201	20,820	Uncrewed suborbital test of Block I CSM (command and service module)
SA-203	July 5, 1966; 14:53:17	Cape Kennedy, LC-37B	AS-203	None	Uncrewed test of unburned LH_{2} behavior in orbit to support S-IVB-500 restart design
SA-202	August 25, 1966; 17:15:32	Cape Kennedy, LC-34	AS-202	25,810	Uncrewed suborbital test of Block I CSM
SA-204		Cape Kennedy, LC-34	Apollo 1	20,412	Was to be first crewed orbital test of Block I CSM. Cabin fire on January 27, 1967, killed astronauts and damaged CM during dress rehearsal for planned February 21, 1967 launch
SA-204	January 22, 1968; 22:48:08	Cape Kennedy, LC-37B	Apollo 5	14,360	Uncrewed orbital test of lunar module, used Apollo 1 launch vehicle
SA-205	October 11, 1968; 15:02:45	Cape Kennedy, LC-34	Apollo 7	16,520	Crewed orbital test of Block II CSM
SA-206	May 25, 1973; 13:00:00	Kennedy, LC-39B	Skylab 2	19,979	Block II CSM ferried first crew to Skylab orbital workshop
SA-207	July 28, 1973; 11:10:50	Kennedy, LC-39B	Skylab 3	20,121	Block II CSM ferried second crew to Skylab orbital workshop
SA-208		Kennedy, LC-39B	AS-208		Standby Skylab 3 rescue CSM-119; not needed
SA-208	November 16, 1973; 14:01:23	Kennedy, LC-39B	Skylab 4	20,847	Block II CSM ferried third crew to Skylab orbital workshop
SA-209		Kennedy, LC-39B	AS-209		Standby Skylab 4 and later Apollo-Soyuz rescue CSM-119. Not needed, currently on display in the KSC rocket garden
SA-209			Skylab 5		Planned CSM mission to lift Skylab workshop's orbit to endure until Space Shuttle ready to fly; cancelled.
SA-210	July 15, 1975; 19:50:01	Kennedy, LC-39B	ASTP	16,780	Apollo CSM with special docking adapter module, rendezvoused with Soyuz 19. Last Saturn IB flight.
SA-211					Unused. First stage was on display at the Alabama Welcome Center on I-65 in Ardmore, Alabama from 1979 to 2023: Now dismantled for disposal. S-IVB stage rests with Skylab underwater training simulator hardware and is on display outdoors at the U.S. Space and Rocket Center in Huntsville, Alabama.
SA-212					Unused. First stage scrapped. S-IVB stage converted to Skylab space station.
SA-213					Only first stage built. Unused and scrapped.
SA-214					Only first stage built. Unused and scrapped.

For earlier launches of vehicles in the Saturn I series, see the list in the Saturn I article.

=== Saturn IB rockets on display ===
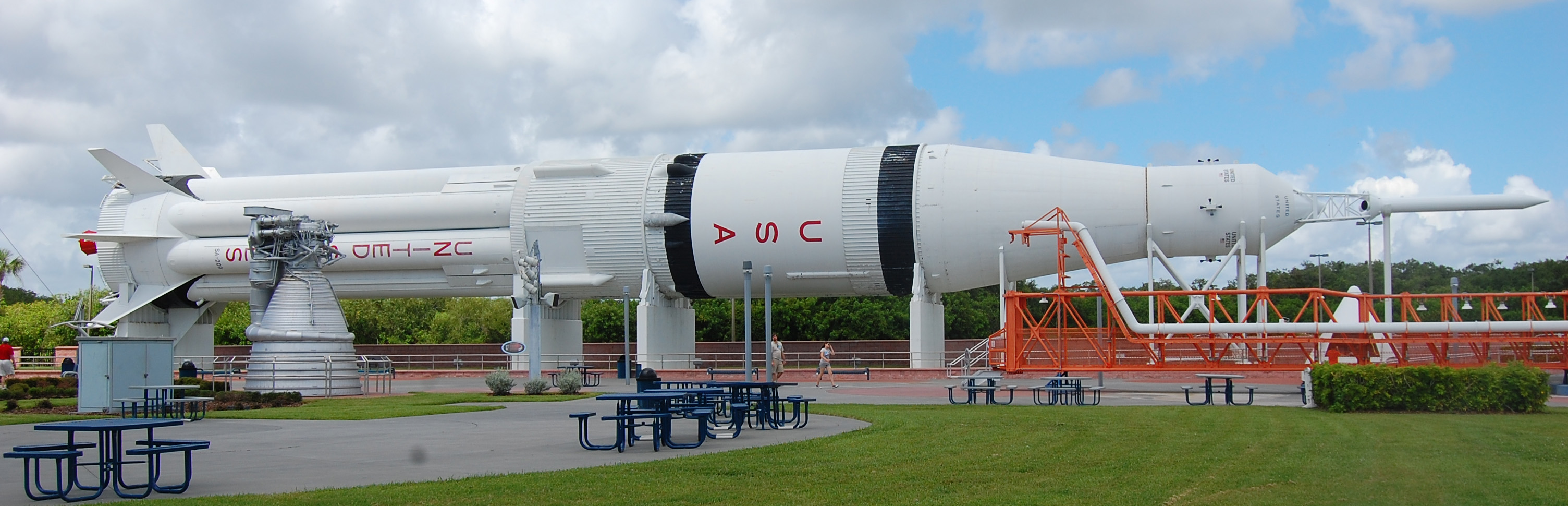
SA-209 on display at KSC

As of 2023 there are two locations where Saturn IB vehicles (or parts thereof) are on display:

- SA-209 is on display at the Kennedy Space Center Visitor Complex, with the Apollo Facilities Verification Vehicle. Due to severe corrosion, the first stage engines and service module were replaced with fabricated duplicates in 1993–1994.
- The SA-211 S-IVB stage was mated with the Skylab underwater training docking adapter and Apollo Telescope Mount and is on display in the Rocket Garden of the U.S. Space & Rocket Center in Huntsville, Alabama. The SA-211 first stage was on display with a mockup S-IVB stage stacked in a launch-ready condition at the Alabama Welcome Center on Interstate 65 in Ardmore, Alabama, since July 1979.34.954548°N 86.89193°W The structural integrity of the display, after four decades of weathering, could not be repaired. Dismantling of the vehicle for disposal began by September 14, 2023.

== Cost ==
In 1972, the cost of a Saturn IB including launch was US$55,000,000 (equivalent to $423,000,000 in 2025).

== See also ==
- Saturn S-IB
- Saturn S-IV
- Comparison of orbital launchers families
- Comparison of orbital launch systems
