= Apollo 3 (band) =

German band

- Origin: Köln, Germany
- Genres: Alternative rock, rap rock
- Years active: 2006–2015
- Members: Henry Horn; Marvin Schlatter; Dario Flick
- Website: apollo3.tv

Apollo 3 was a German teen rock band. The trio consisted of boys named Henry, Marvin, and Dario.

== History ==
=== 2006–2009: Early years and debut album ===
The members all come from Cologne and already played together at the age of nine. They were in the same form in school for three years. When they turned ten, their class teacher noticed their musical talent and made contact to the songwriter and music producer Niko Floss. Their debut album Apollo 3 was published on 8 May 2009 through the major label Sony Music Entertainment and included the single "Superhelden", which was used as theme melody in the film The Crocodiles.

At the time of the publication, the band members were 11 (Henry) and 12 (Marvin and Dario) years old. For the song "Superhelden", a music video was made, which was played in cinemas. The single reached number 35 in the German charts; the album reached number 33. On 19 June 2009, the second single release, "Startschuss", was published, which reached number 84 in the German charts.

=== 2010: Second album 2010 and contributing in a cinema film ===
On 12 March 2010, the second album, 2010, was released, which included next to ten old songs from the previous album five new ones. Two of those were published as singles. The single "Chaos" was released on 9 April 2010 and "Unverwundbar" on 13 August 2010. In the film Devil's Kickers based on Frauke Nahrgang's books and audiobooks, the band members all played a role. Henry played the main character Moritz, while Marvin and Dario played the minor roles Shadow and Alex. The theme melody was "Diabolisch" from their album.

=== 2011: Theme melody for a cinema film ===
As a theme melody for the film Löwenzahn – Das Kinoabenteuer the song "Überflieger" was released, which was also published as a single on 6 May 2011. The single "Adrenalin" from the first album was also used.

=== 2012–2013: Third album Feier dein Leben ===
In 2012 the songs "Limit" and "Wir sehn uns dann am Meer" were performed in concerts as forerunners for the next album. Latter was published in the summer of 2013 as a single, in a version without Marvin singing. On 13 September another forerunner was published as a single "Feier Dein Leben", again without Marvin singing. In the same month, on 27 September 2013, the album "Feier Dein Leben" was published. The album not only has differences in the style of music to the previous albums, but also in the voice of Henry. Also Marvin only sings in one of 13 songs. In September 2013 RTL2 Berlin – Tag & Nacht made the second single extraction from their 2013 album "Feier Dein Leben" to their campaign song.

=== 2014: Performances and tour ===
The band had a guest performance in the scripted reality show Köln 50667. In the episode they played a concert in a club with a performance of "Feier Dein Leben". In February 2014 the band went on their "Feier Dein Leben" – tour in Berlin, Hamburg and Cologne.

=== 2015: Working on a new album ===
The members of the Apollo 3 announced a new album with photos in the studio. On 20 March 2015, they revealed a snippet from one of their new songs.

== Other works ==
As their first song "Superhelden" was the theme song of the film The Crocodiles, the band shot a music video with Leonie Tepe (Maria), who also played one of the crocodiles.

2007: Henry Horn had a part in one episode of Alarm für Cobra 11 – Die Autobahnpolizei.

In the teenager series Schloss Einstein, the band had a guest part playing a jury.

They were the prominent faces in the RTL2 "It's fun" campaign for eight weeks.

== Members ==
- Henry Horn – lead vocals
- Dario Alessandro Barbanti-Flick – guitar
- Marvin Schlatter – keyboard, rapping

== Filmography ==
Film
Year	Film	Henry's role	Dario's role	Marvin's role	Notes
2007	Alarm für Cobra 11 – Die Autobahnpolizei	Eric	-	-	Episode: "In bester Absicht"
2010	Devil's Kickers	Moritz	Alex	Shadow	
2011	Schloss Einstein	Jury member	Jury member	Jury member	Episode 671
2016	Köln 50667	Jury member	-	-	Episode 798
2017	Ein Fall für zwei	Jakob Unger	-	-	Episode: "Ohne Skrupel"
2018	Der Lehrer	Marcel	-	-	Episode: "Ich bin 'ne wandelnde Sonnenuhr"
2018	WaPo Bodensee	Marten Rambach	-	-	5 episodes
2018	SOKO München	Tom Fach	-	-	Episode: "Tod im Schweinestall"
2019	In aller Freundschaft – Die jungen Ärzte	Max Strehlow	-	-	Episode: "Der letzte Tag"
2019	Dem Horizont so nah	Jakob	-	-	
2019	SOKO Potsdam	Max Henschel	-	-	2 episodes

=== Singles ===
- 2009: "Superhelden" ("Superheroes")
- 2009: "Startschuss" ("Starting Signal")
- 2010: "Chaos"
- 2013: "Wir sehn uns dann am Meer" ("See You at the Sea")
- 2013: "Feier dein Leben" ("Celebrate Your Life")

=== Music videos ===
- 2009: "Superhelden" ("Superheroes")
- 2009: "Startschuss" ("Starting Signal")
- 2010: "Chaos"
- 2013: "Wir sehn uns dann am Meer" ("See You at the Sea")
- 2013: "Feier dein Leben" ("Celebrate Your Life")
- 2014: "Limit"

=== Soundtrack ===
- 2009: The Crocodiles – Superhelden ("Superheroes") and Adrenalin
- 2009: E-Explosiv – Das Magazin – Brich mein Herz ("Break My Heart")
- 2010: Die Teufelskicker – Diabolisch ("Diabolically") and Adrenalin Remix
- 2010: The Crocodiles Strike Back – Superhelden ("Superheroes")
- 2011: The Crocodiles: All for One – Superhelden ("Superheroes")
- 2011: Löwenzahn – Das Kinoabenteuer – Überflieger ("High Flyer")

=== Album ===
- 2009: Apollo 3
- 2010: 2010
- 2013: Feier dein Leben ("Celebrate Your Life")
