= AS-201 =

Test flight within the Apollo program

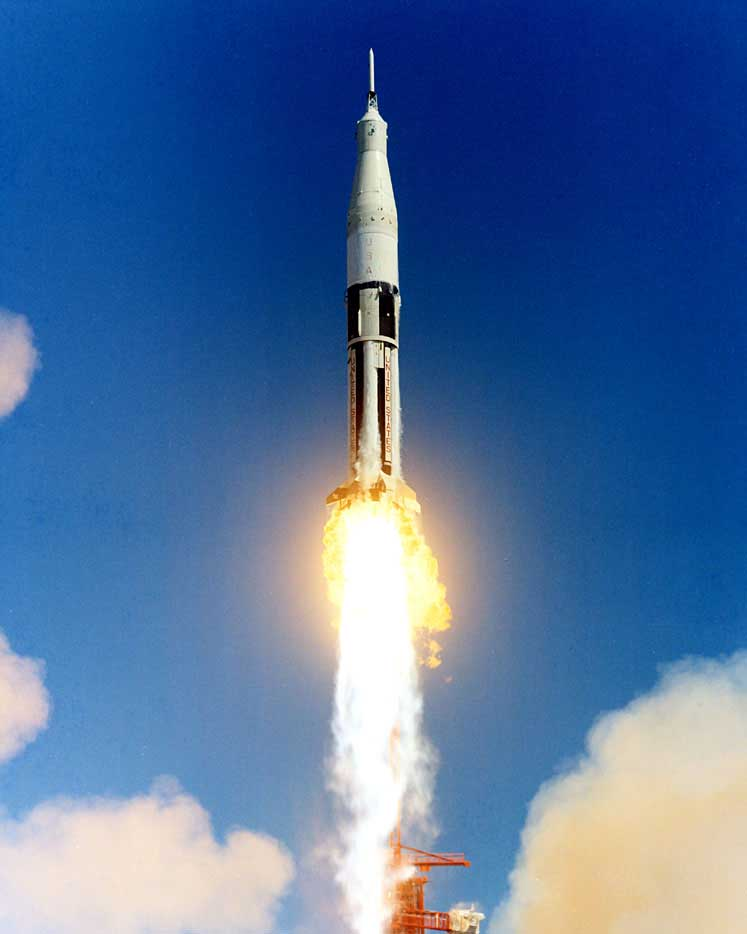
- Launch of AS-201, the first flight of the Apollo spacecraft and Saturn IB launch vehicle
- Mission type: Suborbital test flight
- Operator: NASA
- Mission duration: 37 minutes, 19.7 seconds
- Range: 8,477 kilometers (4,577 nautical miles)
- Apogee: 492.1 kilometers (265.7 nautical miles)

Spacecraft properties
- Spacecraft: Apollo CSM-009
- Manufacturer: North American Aviation
- Launch mass: 15,294 kilograms (33,718 lb)

Start of mission
- Launch date: February 26, 1966, 16:12:01 UTC
- Rocket: Saturn IB SA-201
- Launch site: Cape Kennedy LC-34

End of mission
- Recovered by: USS Boxer
- Landing date: February 26, 1966, 16:49:21 UTC
- Landing site: South Atlantic Ocean; 8°56′S 10°43′W

AS-201 (also known as SA-201, Apollo 1-A, or Apollo 1 prior to the 1967 pad fire), flown February 26, 1966, was the first uncrewed test flight of an entire production Block I Apollo command and service module and the Saturn IB launch vehicle. The spacecraft consisted of the second Block I command module and the first Block I service module. The suborbital flight was a partially successful demonstration of the service propulsion system and the reaction control systems of both modules, and successfully demonstrated the capability of the command module's heat shield to survive re-entry from low Earth orbit.

== Vehicle configuration ==
=== Spacecraft ===
The command and service module CSM-009 was a Block I version, designed before the lunar orbit rendezvous method was chosen for the Apollo lunar landing; therefore it lacked capability to dock with a lunar module. Block I also employed preliminary designs of certain subsystems, and was heavier than the Block II version with lunar mission capability. All previous command and service modules flown (with one exception) were boilerplate versions.

CM-009 was the second production Block I command module to fly, the first being CM-002 flown on a Little Joe II rocket for the final launch escape system abort test, designated A-004. CM-009 varied from the production configuration by the omission of the guidance and navigation system; crew couches, displays, and associated equipment; and by the addition of a control programmer and open-loop emergency detection system.

SM-009 was the first production Block I service module to fly. It varied from the production configuration by replacement of the electrical power-generating fuel cells with batteries, and omission of the S-band communication equipment.

The launch also included a Block I launch escape system (LES), and the first flight of the Spacecraft–LM adapter (SLA) which connected the spacecraft to the launch vehicle.

=== Launch vehicle ===
The Saturn IB was the uprated version of the Saturn I rocket flown in ten earlier Apollo missions. It featured an upgrade of the first stage (S-IB-1) engines to increase total thrust from 1,500,000 lbf (6,700 kN) of thrust to 1,600,000 lbf (7,100 kN), and replacement of the second stage with the S-IVB. This stage used a new liquid hydrogen-burning J-2 engine which would also be used on the S-II second stage of the Saturn V lunar launch vehicle. A modified version of the S-IVB, with an in-space restartable J-2, would also be used as the third stage of the Saturn V. It also used a new model of the guidance and control system known as the Instrument Unit, which would also be used on the Saturn V.

== Objectives ==
The objectives of the mission were to:

- Demonstrate the Saturn IB launch vehicle propulsion, guidance and electrical systems
- Demonstrate structural compatibility between the launch vehicle and CSM, ensuring the spacecraft's design loads weren't exceeded
- Demonstrate appropriate separation of all vehicle elements
- Demonstrate the CSM's heat shield, service propulsion system (including in-space restart), CM and SM reaction control systems, environmental control of cabin pressure and temperature, partial communications, stability and control, Earth landing system, and electrical power subsystem.
- Evaluate the Emergency Detection System in an open-loop configuration
- Demonstrate the CM heat shield ablator at a 200 BTU/ft^{2}/sec heat transfer rate
- Demonstrate support facilities for launch, mission control, and recovery

The mission profile called for the Saturn IB to launch the spacecraft on an east-by-southeast heading into a high ballistic trajectory; then the CSM would separate from the SLA. The service module engine would be fired twice, then the command module would re-enter and land in the south Atlantic Ocean.

== Preparation for flight ==
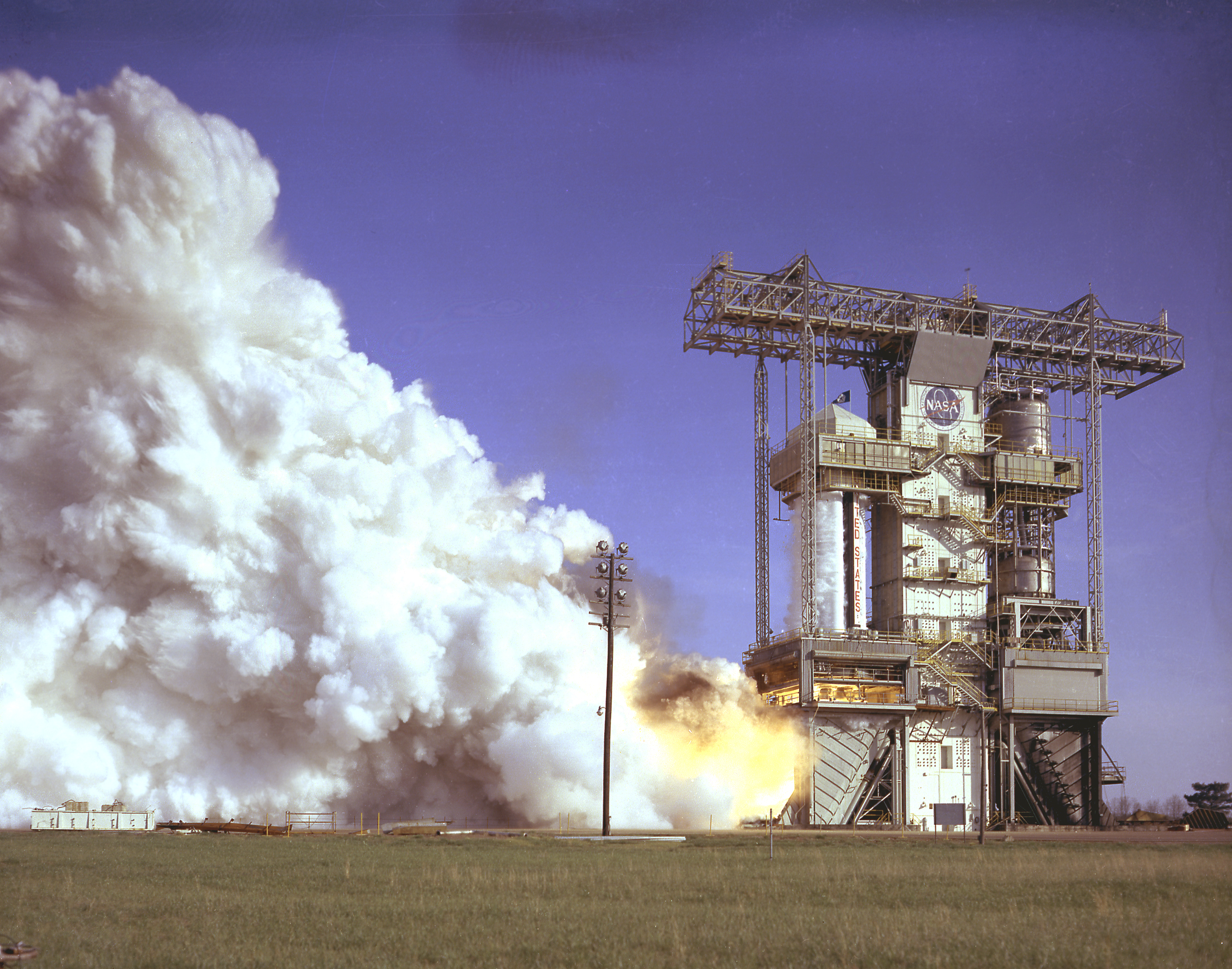
S-IB-1 undergoing a full-duration static firing at MSFC on April 13, 1965

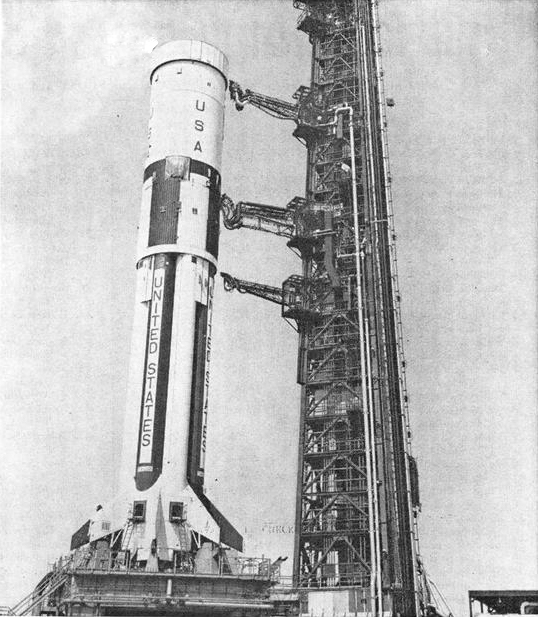
S-IB-1 undergoing propellant tests for AS-201 on December 20, 1965

The first piece of the rocket to arrive at the Cape was the S-IB stage on August 14, 1965, by the barge Promise. It was built by Chrysler and featured eight H-1 engines built by Rocketdyne. The S-IVB second stage arrived next on September 18. The Instrument Unit that would control the launch vehicle arrived October 22, the command module arrived three days later and the service module on October 27.

The first stage was erected at the pad soon after arriving at Cape Kennedy. The second stage joined it on October 1. After fixing some problems in the Instrument Unit it was mated to the S-IVB on October 25. The CSM was mated on December 26.

The first problem encountered by NASA came on October 7. The RCA 110A computer which would test the rocket and thus, automating the process, was ten days behind schedule meaning that it would not be at the Cape before November 1. This meant that by the middle of October little could be done at the pad. When the computer finally did arrive it continued to have problems with the punch cards and also the capacitors that did not operate well under a protective coating. In the end however the testing of the launch vehicle was still on schedule.

Testing was running around the clock during December. Technicians were testing the CSM's fuel systems during the day and the testing was running on the rocket at night.

There was even an instance of a variant of the Y2K bug in the computer. As it ran past midnight, when the time changed from 2400 to 0001 the computer could not handle it and "turned into a pumpkin" according to an interview with Frank Bryan, a Kennedy Space Center Launch Vehicle Operations Engineering staff member.

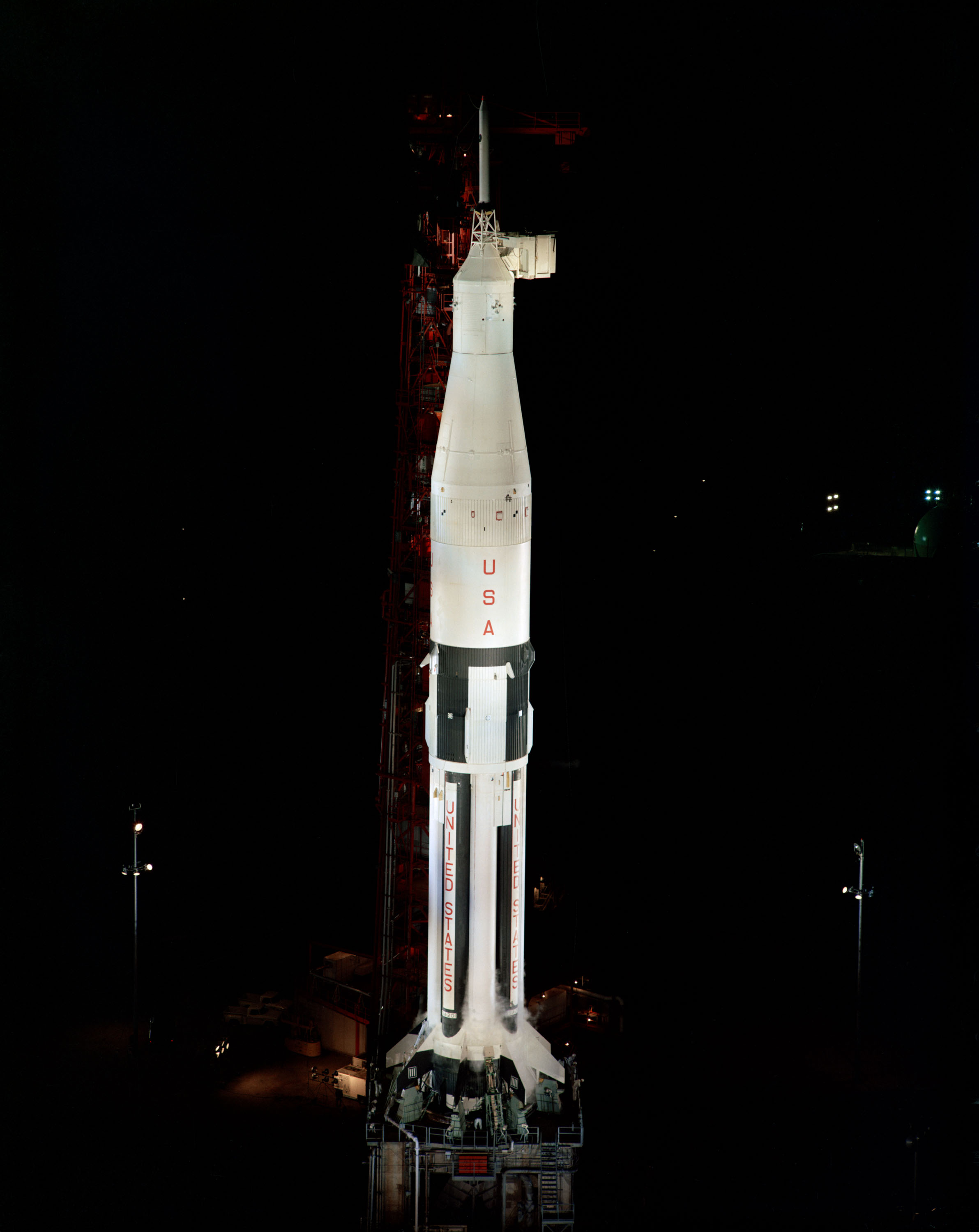
Saturn 1B countdown demonstration at LC 34 on February 6, 1966

In the end the testing regimen slowly completed and the plugs-out tests were completed proving that the rocket could function by itself.

== Flight ==
=== Launch attempt ===
The first launch attempt was scheduled for February 26, 1966. There were several small delays, but when the pressure in one of the fuel tanks in the S-IVB fell below the allowed limits, the onboard computer aborted the launch four seconds before launch.

Though the problem could be fixed easily, it was thought that it could not be done within the launch window. After running a simulated launch and 150 seconds of flight to show that the rocket could operate with the lower pressure in the fuel tank, the launch was reinstated.

=== Flight ===
Finally, after months of delays and problems, the first flight of the Saturn IB lifted off from Pad 34. The first stage worked perfectly, lifting the rocket to 57 kilometers (31 nmi), when the S-IVB took over and lifted the spacecraft to 425 kilometers (229 nmi). The CSM separated and continued upwards to 488 kilometers (263 nmi).

The CSM then fired its own rocket to accelerate the spacecraft towards Earth. The first burn lasted for 184 seconds. It then fired later for ten seconds. This proved that the engine could restart in space, a crucial part of any crewed flight to the Moon.

It entered the atmosphere traveling 8,300 meters per second (27,000 ft/s). It splashed down 37 minutes after launch, 72 kilometers (39 nmi) from the planned touch down point, and was on board the aircraft carrier USS Boxer two hours later.

== Problems ==
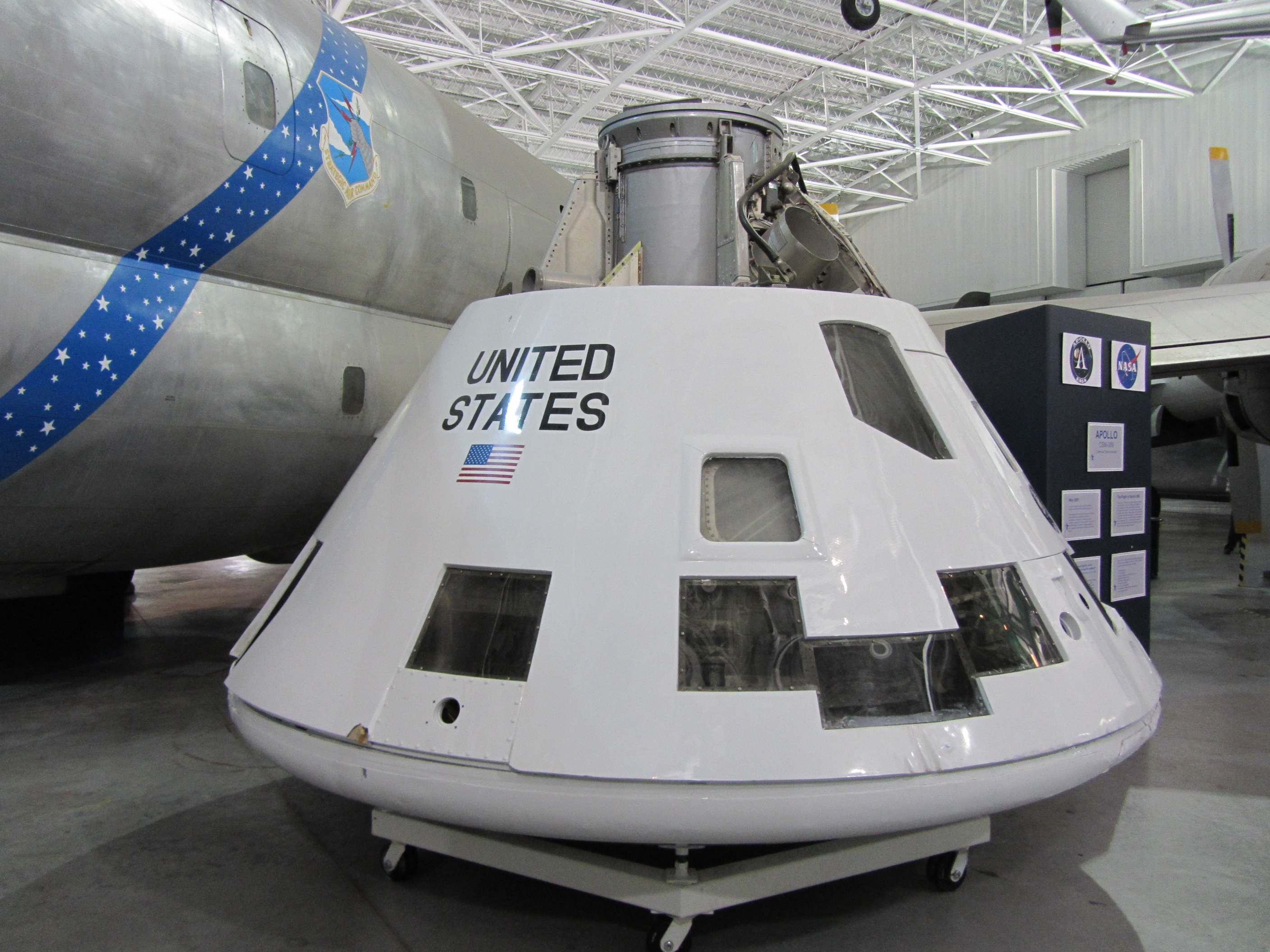
AS-201 CM-009 exhibited at the Strategic Air and Space Museum.

There were three problems encountered on the flight. The service module engine worked properly for only 80 seconds, interrupted by the presence of helium pressurant gas in the combustion chamber. Helium was used to pressurize the fuel tanks but should not have been in the combustion chamber. This was caused by a break in an oxidizer line that allowed helium to mix with the oxidizer.

The second problem was an electrical system failure which caused the command module to lose steering control during reentry. Last, measurements that were intended to be taken during reentry, failed due to a short circuit. Both of these problems were found to be due to incorrect wiring, and were easily fixed.

== Capsule location ==
After the flight the capsule was also used for drop tests at White Sands Missile Range. It is now on display at the Strategic Air Command & Aerospace Museum, Ashland, Nebraska.

== See also ==
- Splashdown
