= Beach Abort =

Uncrewed abort test of Project Mercury

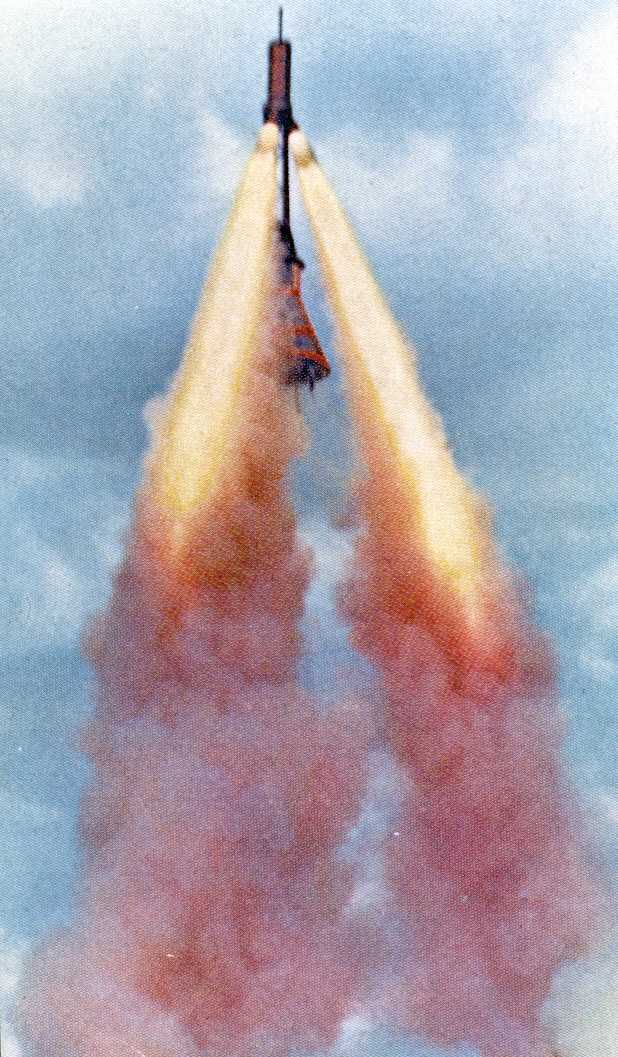
- Color photograph of the test flight of Mercury Spacecraft #1 on May 9, 1960.
- Mission type: Abort test
- Operator: NASA
- Mission duration: 1 minutes, 16 seconds
- Distance travelled: 1.6 kilometres (1 mi)
- Apogee: 0.80 kilometres (0.5 mi)

Spacecraft properties
- Spacecraft: Mercury No.1
- Manufacturer: McDonnell Aircraft
- Launch mass: 1,007 kilograms (2,220 lb)

Start of mission
- Launch date: May 9, 1960
- Rocket: Mercury LES
- Launch site: Wallops

End of mission
- Landing date: May 9, 1960
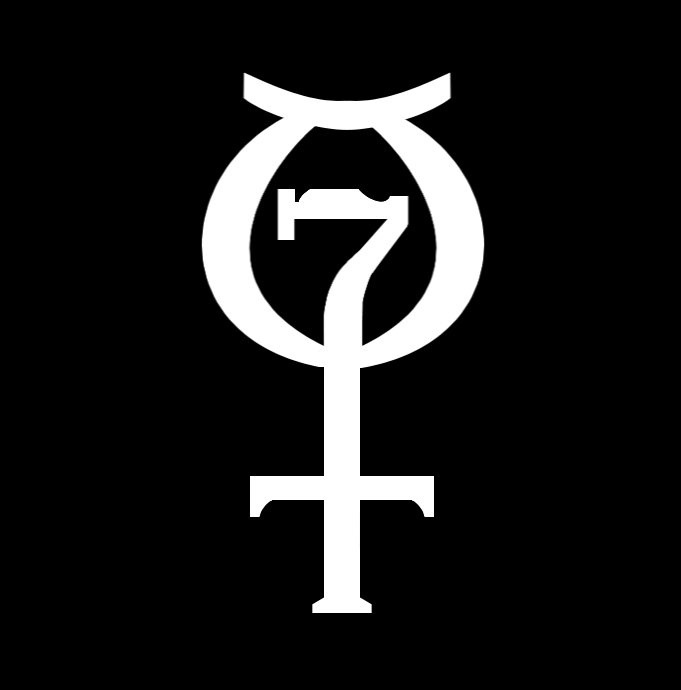
- Project Mercury; Abort Tests

The Beach Abort was an uncrewed test in NASA's Project Mercury, of the Mercury spacecraft Launch Escape System. Objectives of the test were a performance evaluation of the escape system, the parachute and landing system, and recovery operations in an off-the-pad abort situation. This test took place at NASA's Wallops Island, Virginia, test facility. In the test, the Mercury spacecraft and its Launch Escape System were fired from ground level. The flight lasted a total of 1 minute, 16 seconds. The spacecraft reached an apogee of 0.751 kilometres (2,465 ft) and splashed down in the ocean with a range of 0.97 kilometres (0.6 mi). Top speed was a velocity of 436 metres per second (976 mph). A Marine Corps helicopter recovered the spacecraft 17 minutes after launch. The test was considered a success, although there was insufficient separation distance when the tower jettisoned. Mercury Spacecraft #1, the first spacecraft off McDonnell's production line, was used in this test. Total payload weight was 1,154 kilograms (2,544 lb).

Mercury Spacecraft #1 is displayed at the New York Hall of Science, Corona Park, NY. It is displayed indoors, suspended from the ceiling, with an escape tower of unknown provenance attached.

Though multiple launch abort tests were designated as "beach aborts," most of which preceded the May 1960 test by nearly a year, the term Beach Abort on its own usually refers to the May 9, 1960 test.

== Gallery ==
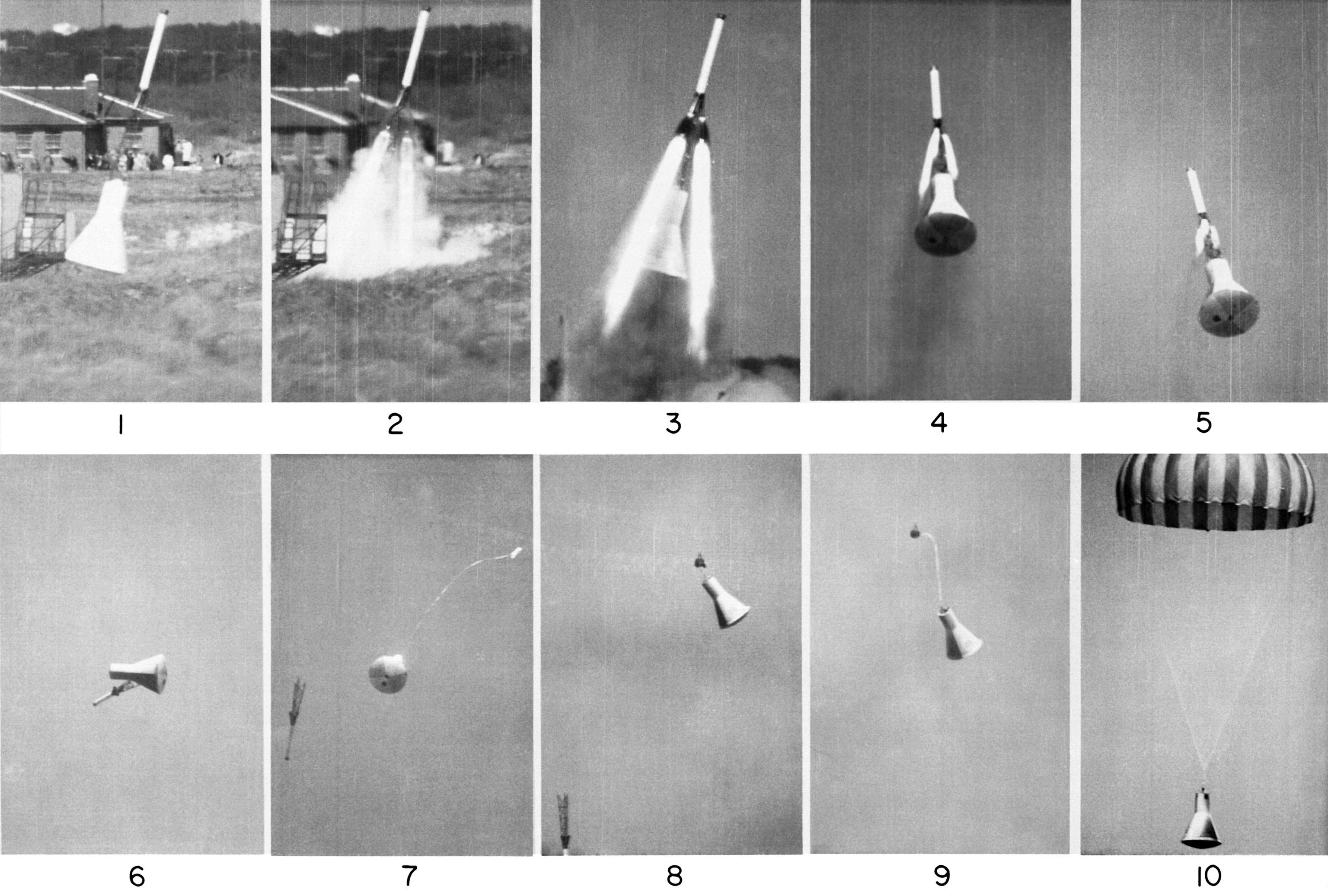
Flight of a boilerplate spacecraft and launch escape system from a separate beach abort. In frame 6 the two separate and the spacecraft lands by parachute in frame 10. Flight profile is nearly identical to the May 1960 test.

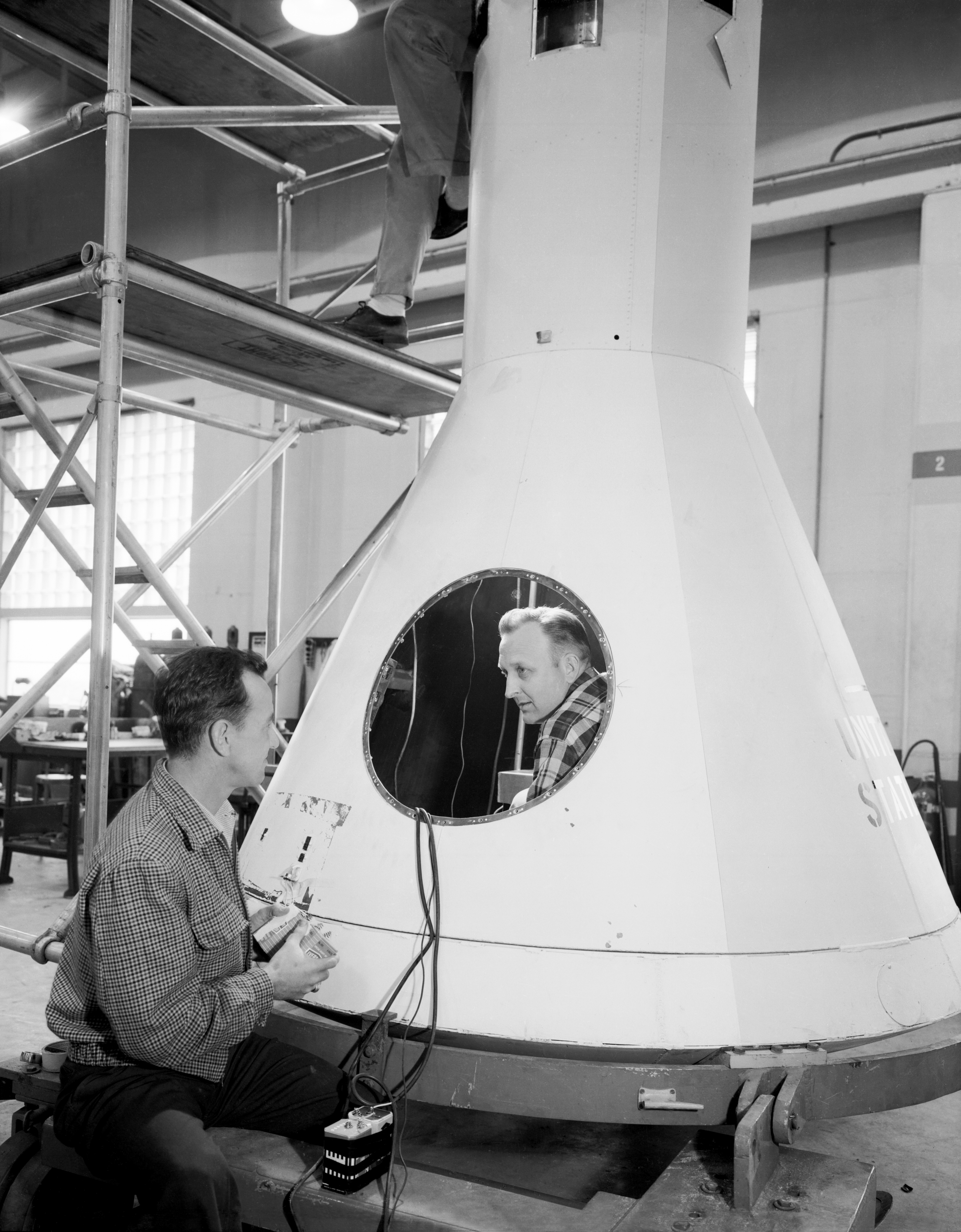
A boilerplate capsule used in a similar beach abort test.

== See also ==
- Boilerplate (spaceflight)
