= Boilerplate (spaceflight) =

Nonfunctional spacecraft or payload

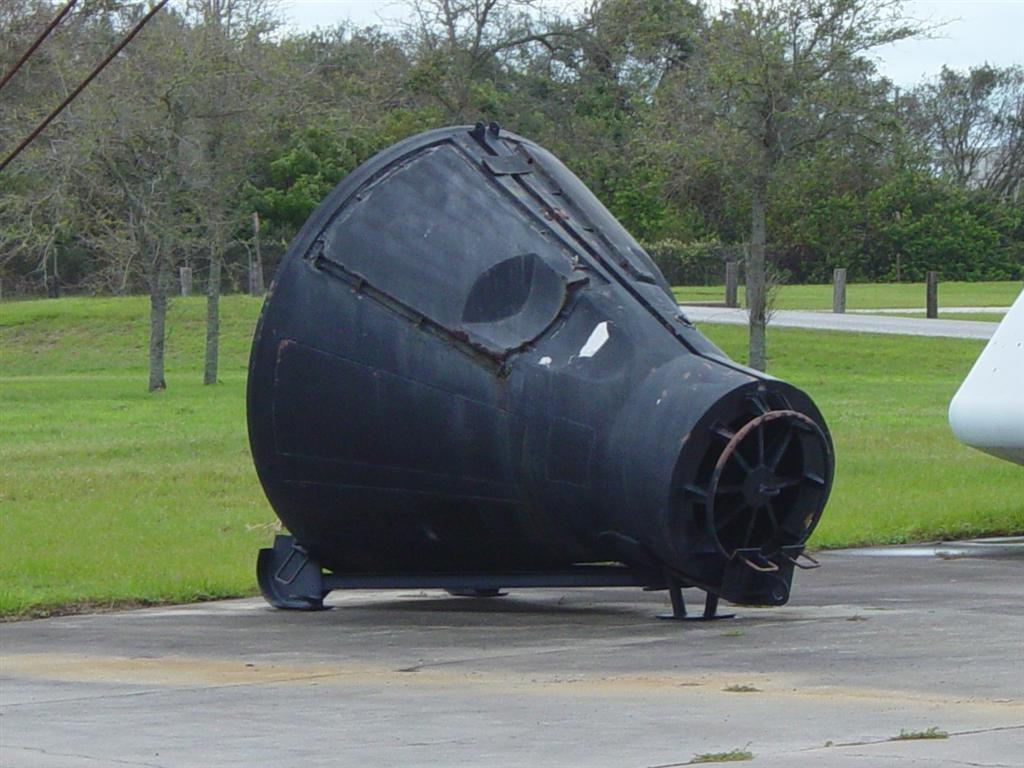
Boilerplate version of Gemini spacecraft on display in the parking lot at Air Force Space and Missile Museum, Cape Canaveral, Florida, October 15, 2004

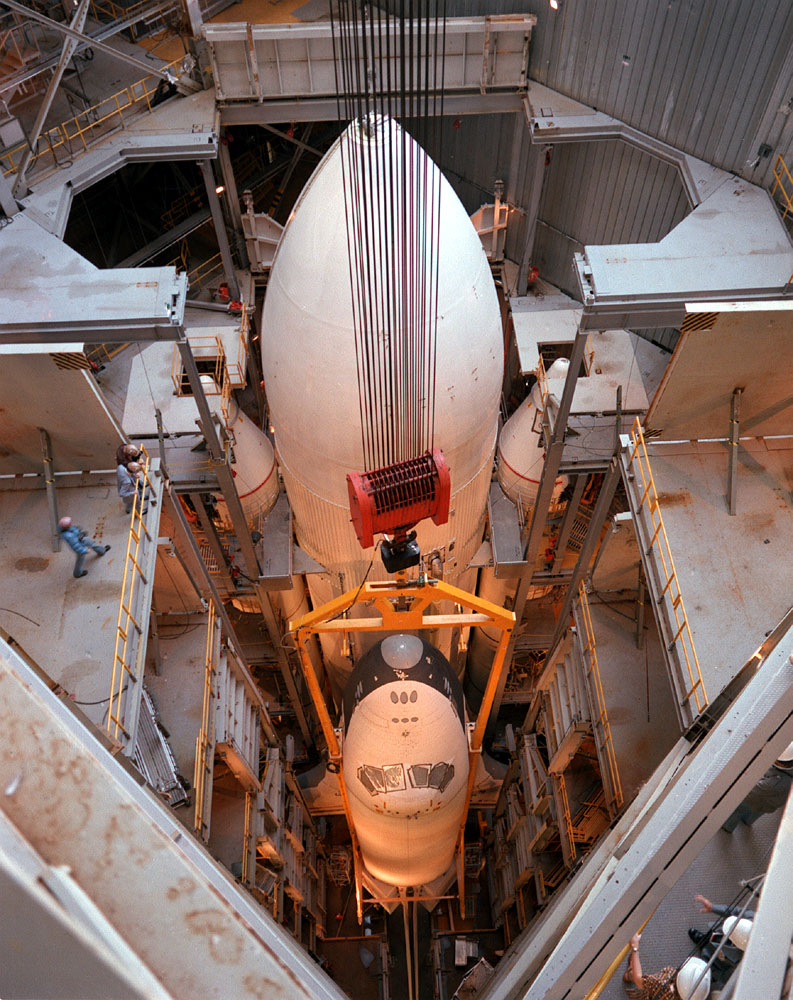
The prototype Space Shuttle orbiter Enterprise in full boilerplate stack configuration with External Tank and SRBs ready to undergo vibration testing at the Marshall Space Flight Center, October 4, 1978

A boilerplate spacecraft, also known as a mass simulator, is a nonfunctional craft or payload that is used to test various configurations and basic size, load, and handling characteristics of rocket launch vehicles. It is far less expensive to build multiple, full-scale, non-functional boilerplate spacecraft than it is to develop the full system (design, test, redesign, and launch). In this way, boilerplate spacecraft allow components and aspects of cutting-edge aerospace projects to be tested while detailed contracts for the final project are being negotiated. These tests may be used to develop procedures for mating a spacecraft to its launch vehicle, emergency access and egress, maintenance support activities, and various transportation processes.

Boilerplate spacecraft are most commonly used to test crewed spacecraft; for example, in the early 1960s, NASA performed many tests using boilerplate Apollo spacecraft atop Saturn I rockets, and Mercury spacecraft atop Atlas rockets (for example Big Joe 1). The engine-less Space Shuttle Enterprise was used as a boilerplate to test launch stack assembly and transport to the launch pad. NASA's now-canceled Constellation program and ongoing Artemis program used boilerplate Orion spacecraft for various testing.

== Mercury boilerplates ==
Mercury boilerplates were manufactured "in-house" by NASA Langley Research Center technicians prior to McDonnell Aircraft Company building the Mercury spacecraft. The boilerplate capsules were designed and used to test spacecraft recovery systems, and escape tower and rocket motors. Formal tests were done on the test pad at Langley and at Wallops Island using the Little Joe rockets.

=== Etymology ===
The term boilerplate originated from the use of boilerplate steel for the construction of test articles/mock-ups. Historically, during the development of the Little Joe series of 7 launch vehicles, there was only one actual boilerplate capsule and it was called such since its conical section was made of steel at the Norfolk Naval Shipyard. This capsule was used in a beach abort test, and then subsequently used in the LJ1A flight. However, the term subsequently came to be used for all the prototype capsules (which in their own right were nearly as complicated as the orbital capsules). This usage was technically incorrect, as those other capsules were not made of boilerplate, but the boilerplate term had effectively been genericized.

=== Notable events ===
Section sources.

- 1959 July 22 – First successful pad abort flight test with a functional escape tower attached to a Mercury boilerplate.
- 1959 July 28 – A Mercury boilerplate with instrumentation to measure sound pressure levels and vibrations from the Little Joe test rocket and Grand Central abort rocket/escape tower.
- 1959 September 9 – A Big Joe Atlas boilerplate Mercury (BJ-1) was successfully launched and flown from Cape Canaveral. This test flight was to determine the performance of the heat shield and heat transfer to the boilerplate, to observe flight dynamics of boilerplate during re-entry into the South Atlantic, to perform and evaluate capsule flotation and recovery system procedures, and to evaluate the entire capsule and rocket characters and system controls.
- 1960 May 9 – Beach Abort test with a launch escape system was successful.
- 1961 February 25 – A successful drop test of the Mercury boilerplate spacecraft fitted with impact skirt, straps and cables, and a heat shield.
- 1961 March 24 – A successful Mercury-Redstone BD (MR-3) launch occurred with an apogee of 181 km (112 mi); first sub-orbital uncrewed flight.

=== Photos ===
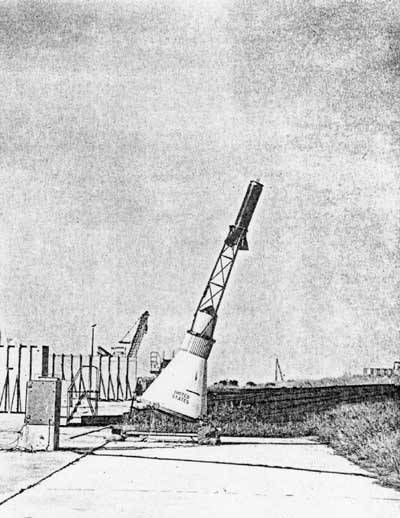
Mercury Beach Abort test

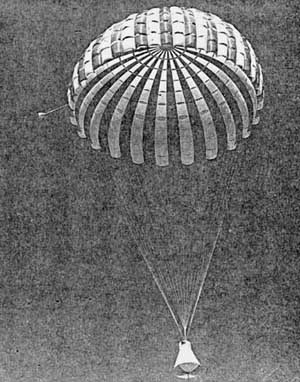
Mercury parachute test

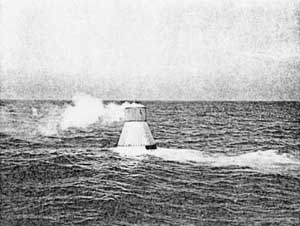
Mercury flotation test

== Gemini boilerplates ==
There were seven specifically named Gemini boilerplates: BP-1, 2, 3, 3A, 4, 5 and 201. Boilerplate 3A had functional doors and had multi-uses for testing watertightness, flotation collars, and egress procedures. Other boilerplates were designated FA-1A, MSC 312, MSC 313 and MSC-307.

=== Photos ===
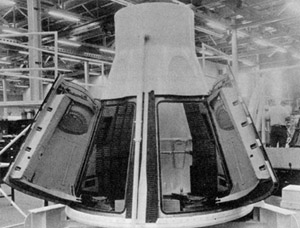
BP3A at the McDonnell plant, St. Louis, Missouri

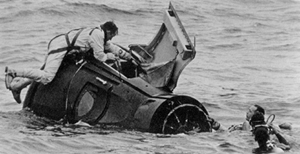
Flotation and rescue test (Gemini Water Egress Trainer)

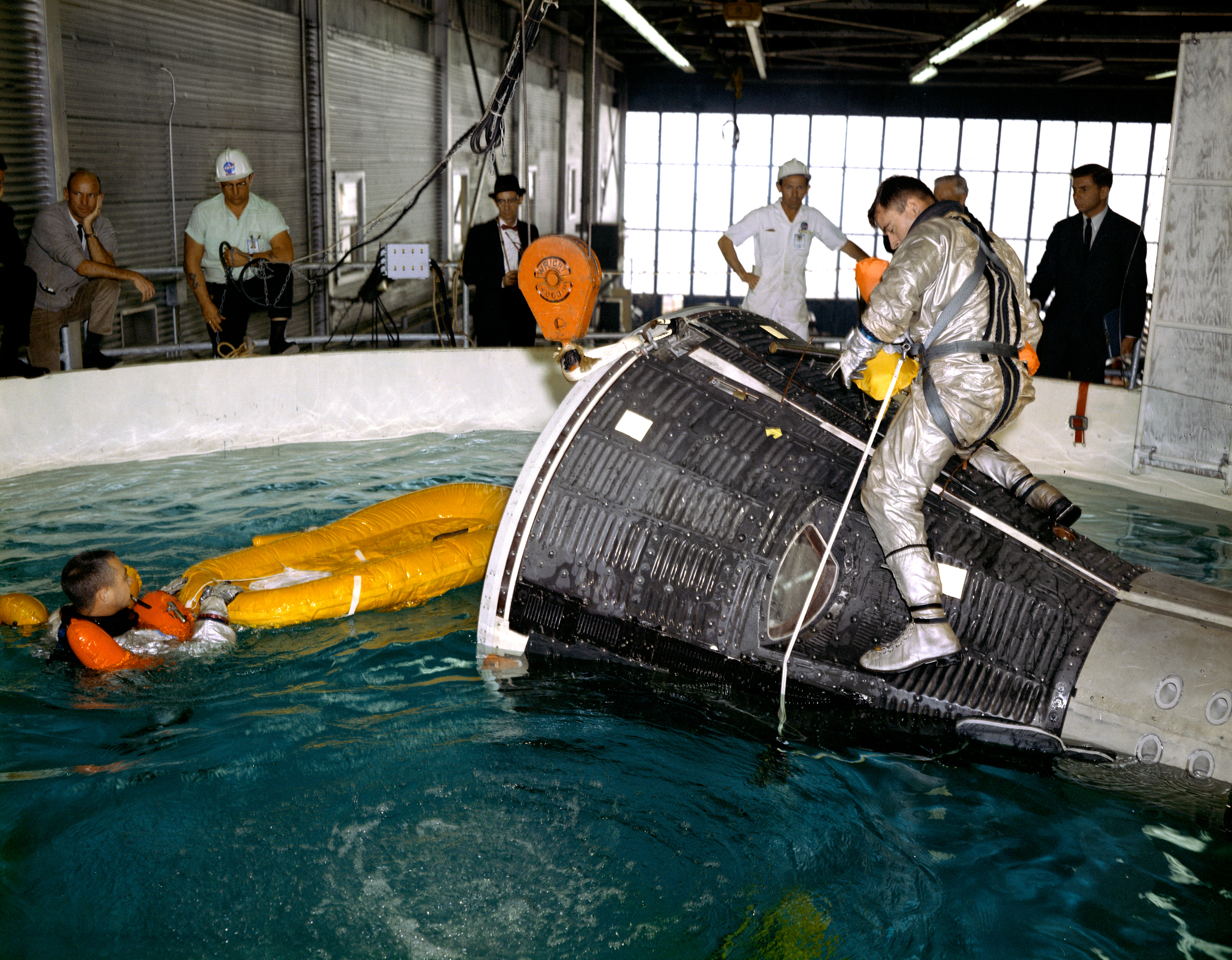
Flotation and egress test (Gemini Static Article 5)

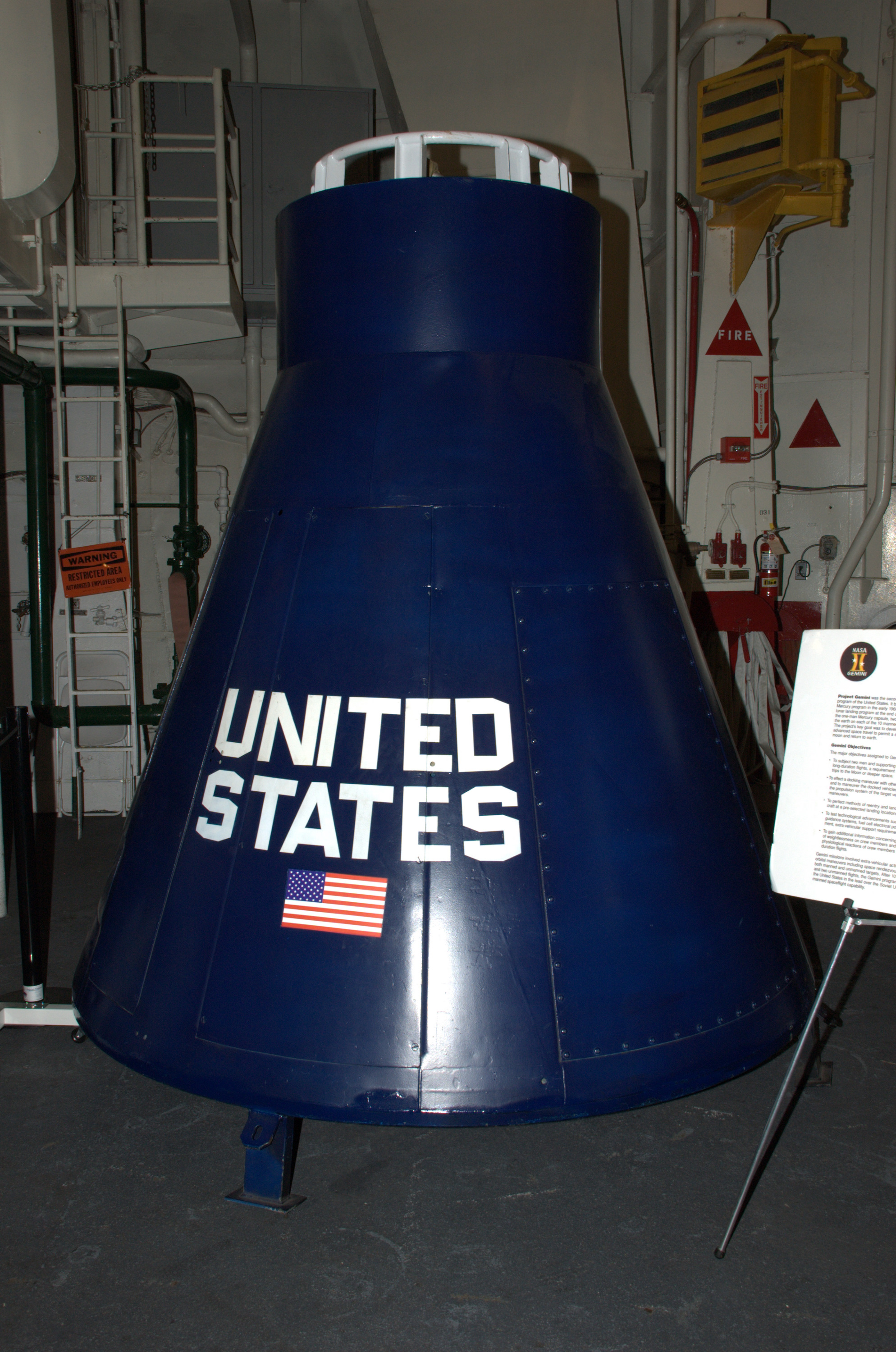
MSC-307 at the USS Hornet Museum

== Apollo boilerplates ==
NASA created a variety of Apollo boilerplates. The final Apollo boilerplate was BP-30, used for swing arm testing. BP-30 is on display at the Kennedy Space Center Apollo/Saturn V Center.

=== Launch escape system tests (LES) ===
Apollo boilerplate command modules were used for tests of the launch escape system (LES) jettison tower rockets and procedures:

- BP-6 with Pad Abort Test-1 – LES pad abort test from launch pad; with photo.
- BP-23A with Pad Abort Test-2 – LES pad abort test of near Block-I CM; with photo.
- BP-23 with Mission A-002 Test Flight – LES test of canards, Oct. 29-Nov. 5, 1964.
- BP-27 with LES-015 – Dynamic tests.
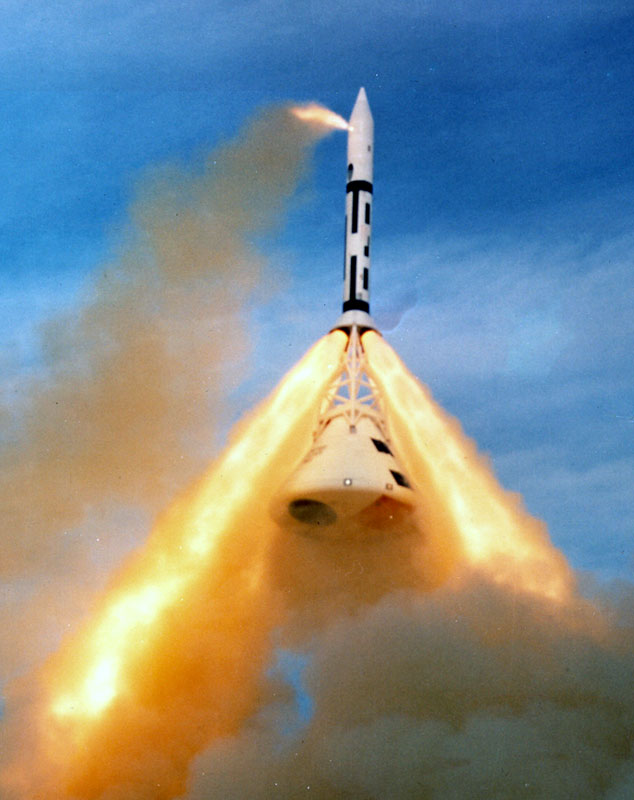
BP-06, Apollo Pad Abort Test #1

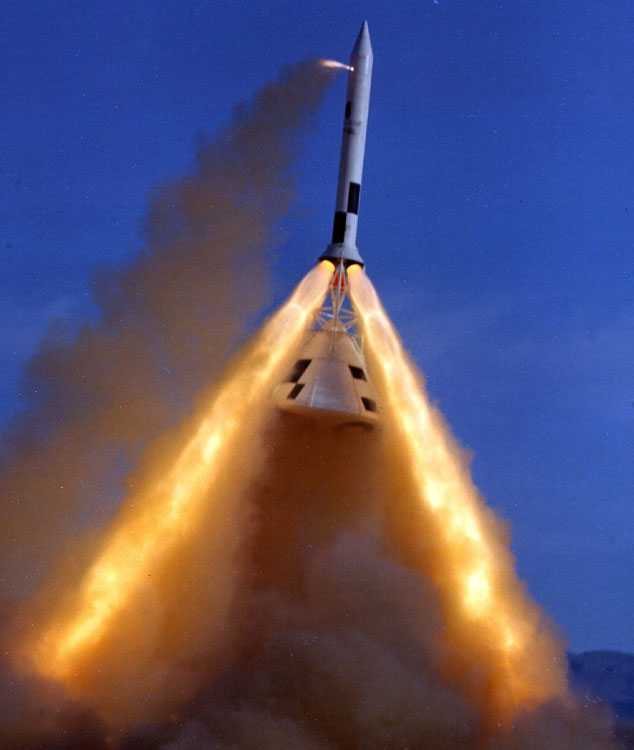
BP-23, Apollo Pad Abort Test #2

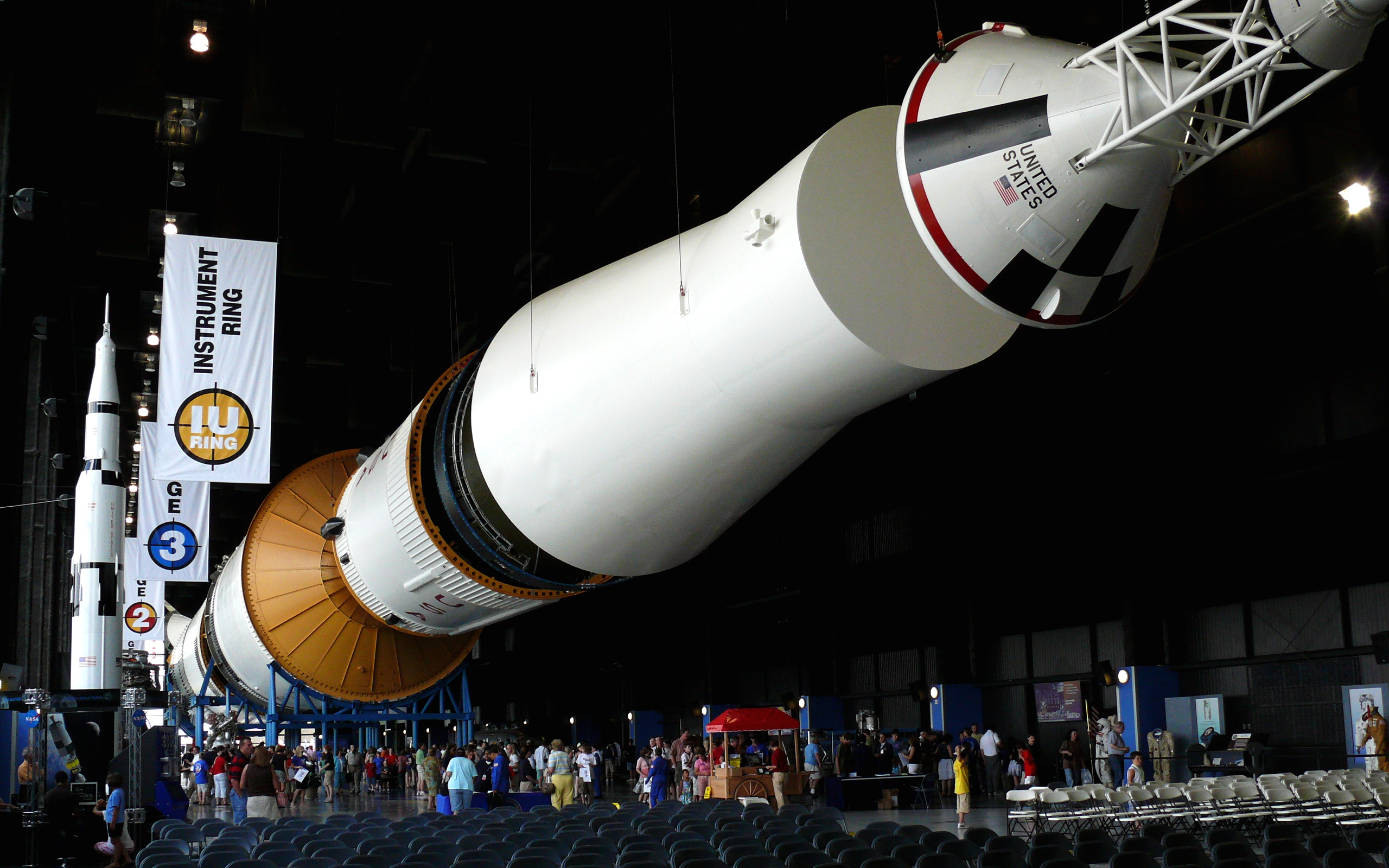
BP-23A, displayed with SA-500D at the U.S. Space & Rocket Center

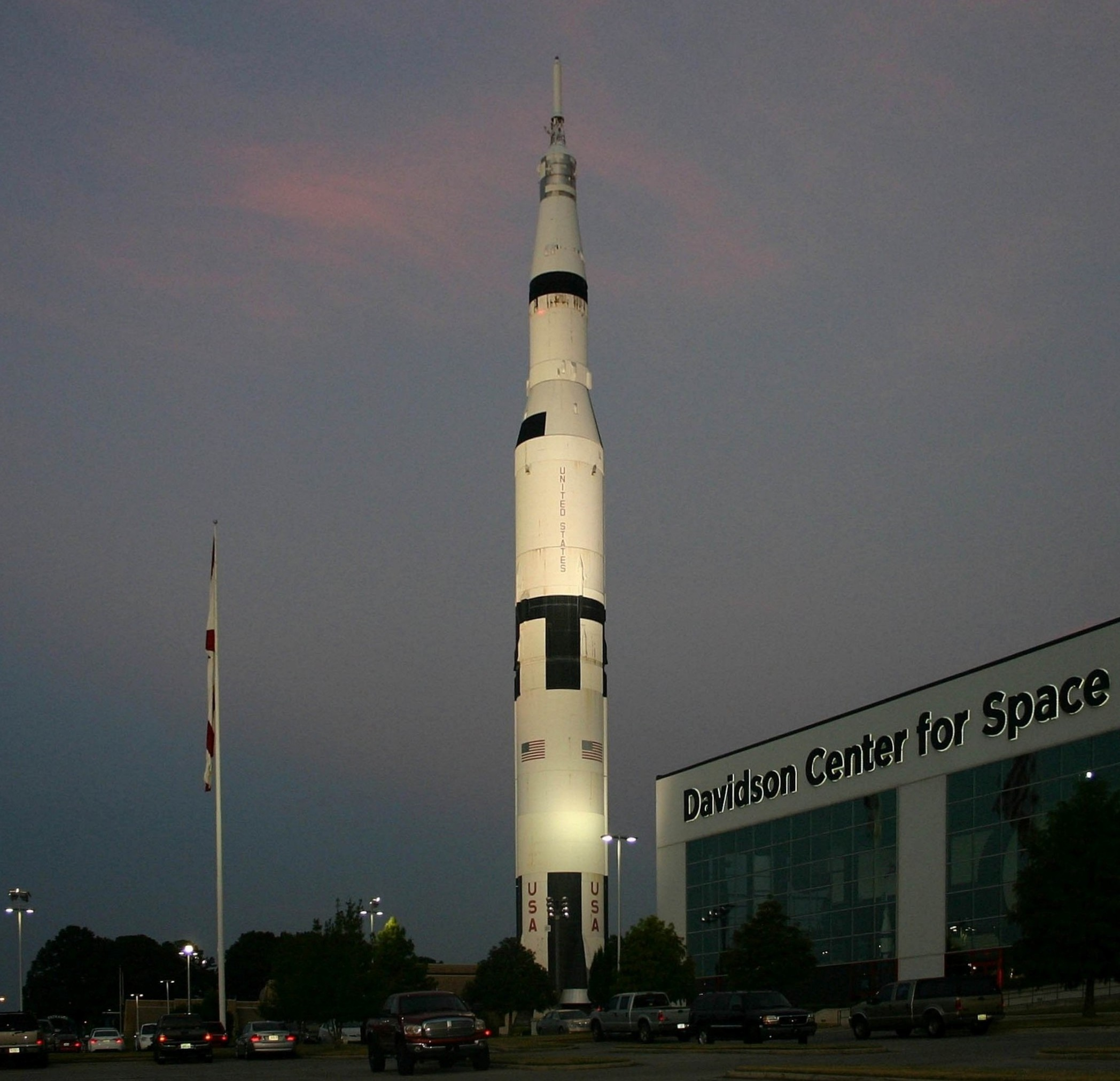
BP-27, on display atop the vertical Saturn V at the U.S. Space & Rocket Center

=== Boilerplate tests ===
- BP-1 – Water impact tests
- BP-2 – Flotation tests storage
- BP-3 – Parachute tests
- BP-6,-6B, – PA-1, later parachute drop test vehicle, and LES pad abort flight test to demonstrate launch escape system's pad-abort performance at White Sands Missile Range.
- BP-9 with mission AS-105 (SA-10) test flight, Micro Meteoroid Dynamic Test; not recovered.
- BP-12 with mission A-001 test flight, now at former NASA Facility, Downey, California to test the LES transonic abort flight performance at White Sands Missile Range.
- BP-13 with mission AS-101 (SA-6) test flight, not recovered.
- BP-14 with environmental control system tests, Oct. 22–29, 1964, consisted of command module 14, service module 3, launch escape system 14, and Saturn launch adapters.
- BP-15 with mission AS-102 (SA-7) test flight, not recovered.
- BP-16 with mission AS-103 (SA-9) test flight, another Micro Meteoroid test, not recovered.
- BP-19A – VHF antenna, parachute drop tests; now at the Columbia Memorial Space Center (former NASA Facility, Downey, CA)
- BP-22 with mission A-003 test flight; boilerplate on display at Johnson Space Center, Houston, TX
- BP-23 – LES high-dynamic-pressure abort flight performance tests at White Sands Missile Range.
- BP-23A – LES pad-abort flight performance tests with Canard, BPC, and major sequencing changes at White Sands Missile Range, now displayed with SA-500D at the U.S. Space & Rocket Center, Huntsville, Alabama.
- BP-25 Command Module (CM) – Water recovery test, at Fort Worth Museum of Transportation(See BP-25 photo)
- BP-26 with mission AS-104 (SA-8) test flight – another micro meterioid test.
- BP-27 command and service module with LES-16 – stack and engine gimbal test. Now on display atop the vertical Saturn V at the U.S. Space & Rocket Center, Huntsville, Alabama.
- BP-28A – Impact tests
- BP-29 – Uprighting drop tests at Downey, CA, Oct. 30, 1964, on display at Barringer Crater, Arizona.
- BP-30 – Swing arm tests; currently on display at Kennedy Space Center's Apollo/Saturn V Center.
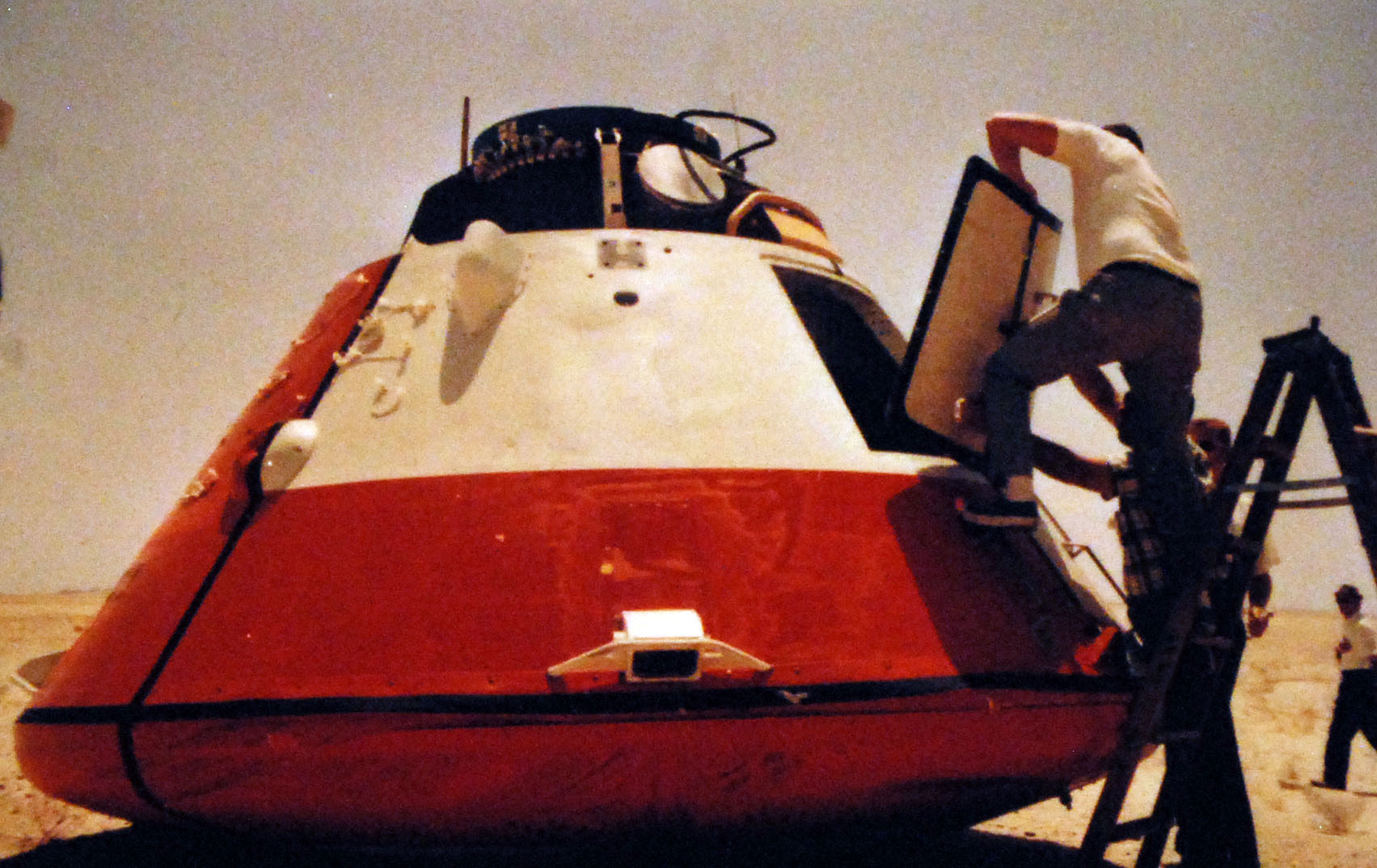
BP-3

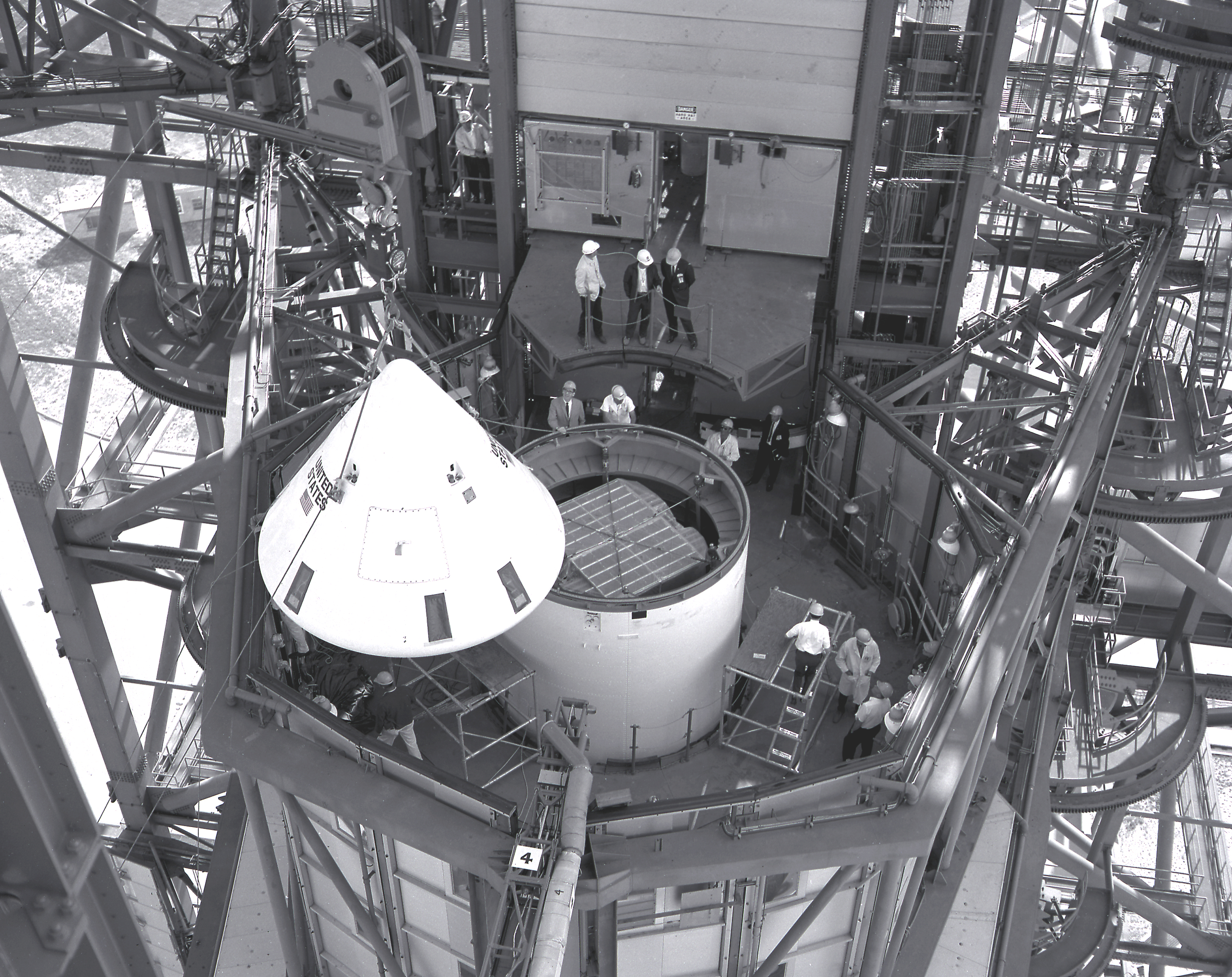
BP-9

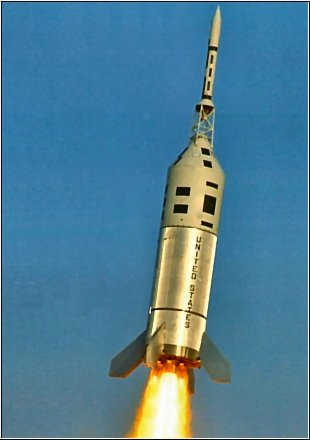
BP-12

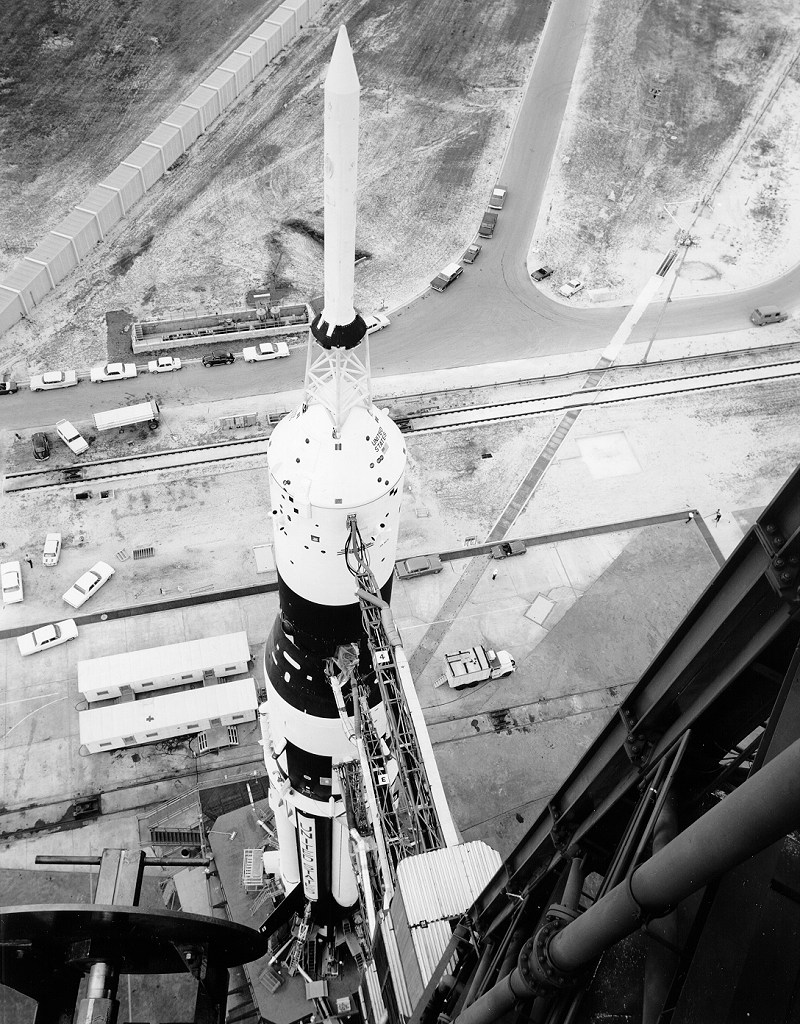
BP-13

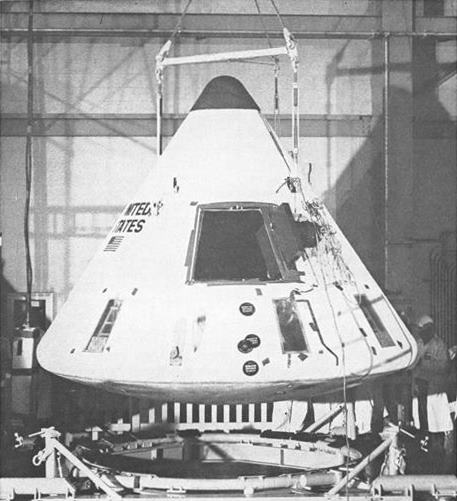
BP-15

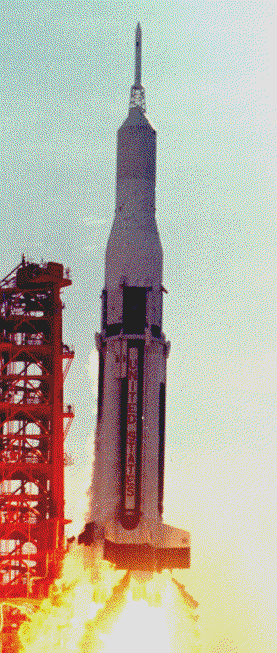
BP-16

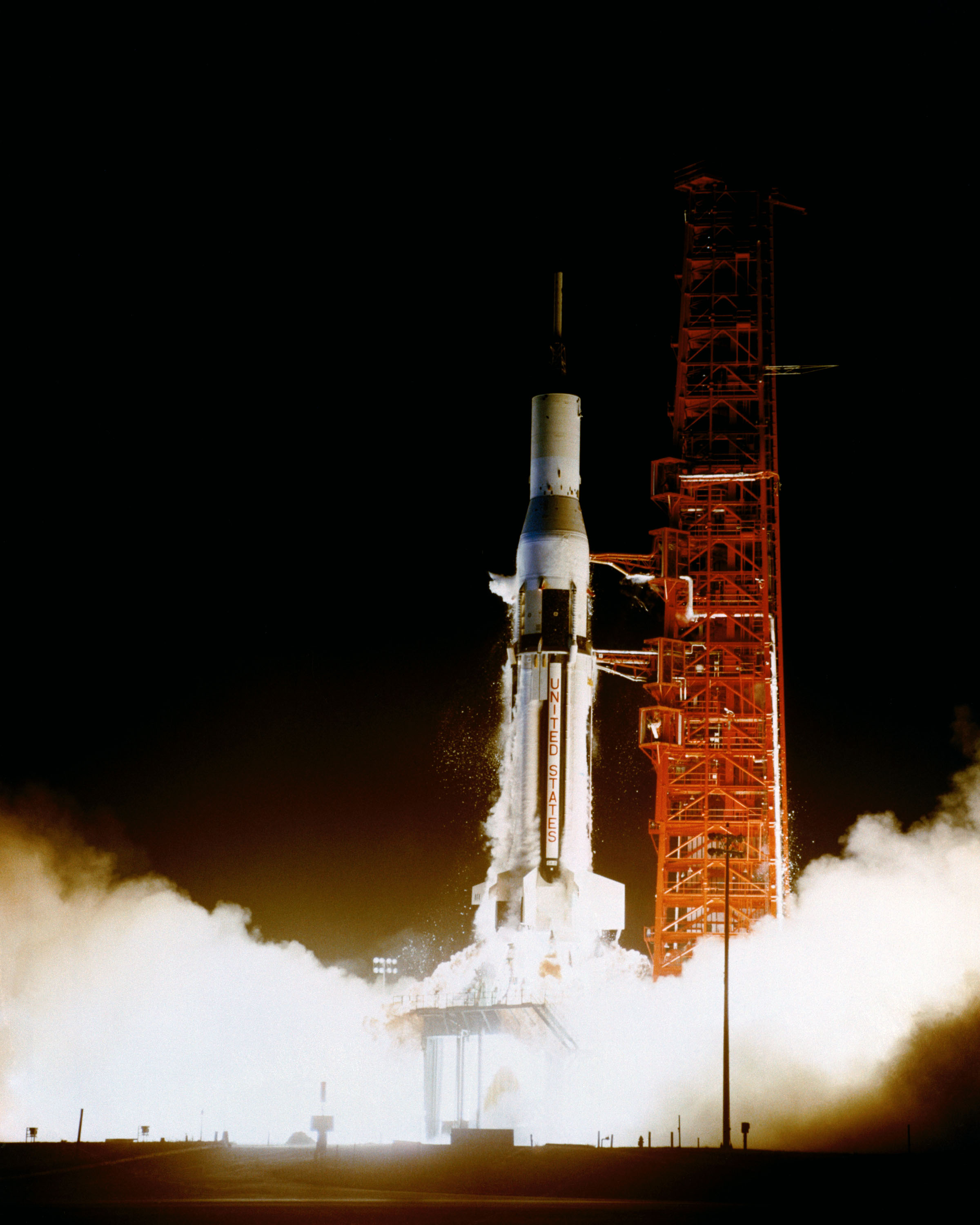
BP-26

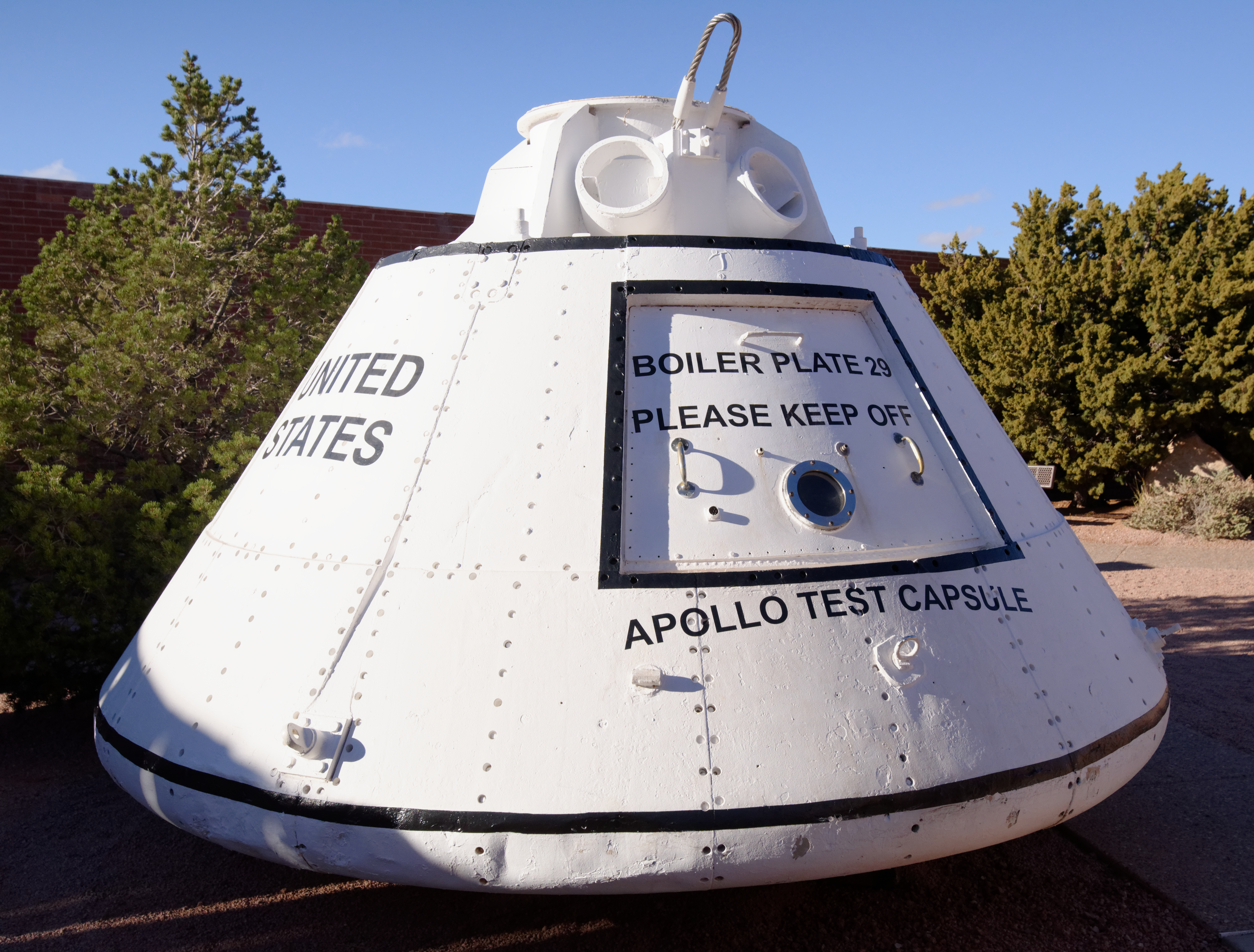
BP-29

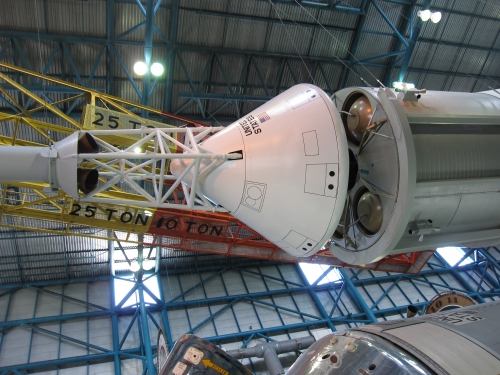
BP-30

=== Specific Apollo BP units ===
==== BP-1101A ====
BP-1101A was used in numerous tests to develop spacecraft recovery equipment and procedures. Specifically, 1101A tested the air bags as part of the uprighting procedure when the Apollo lands upside down in the water. The sequence of the bags inflating caused the capsule to roll and upright itself.

This McDonnell boilerplate is now on loan to the Wings Over the Rockies Air and Space Museum, Denver, Colorado, from the Smithsonian. BP-1101A has an external painted marking of AP.5. Examination of the interior in 2006 revealed large heavy steel ingots. After further research, a new paint scheme was applied in June 2007.

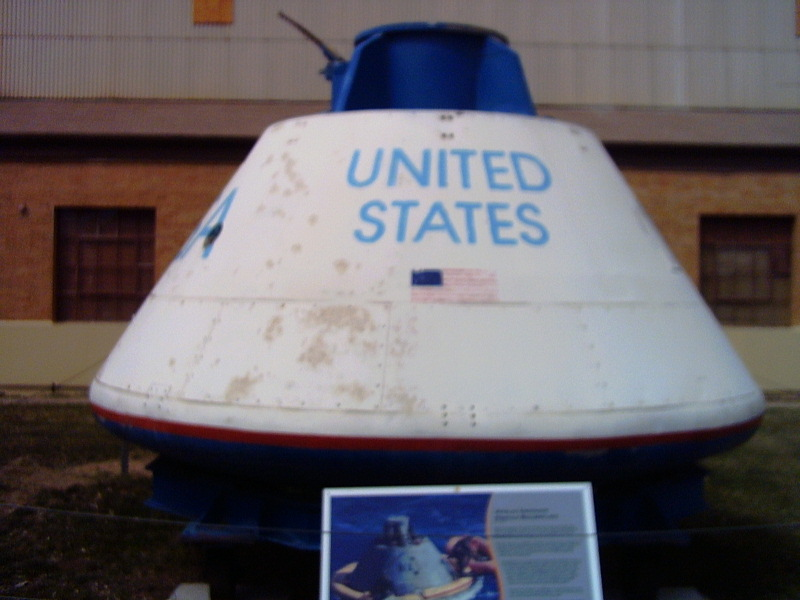
BP1101A AP5, front view, Wings Museum, 2006

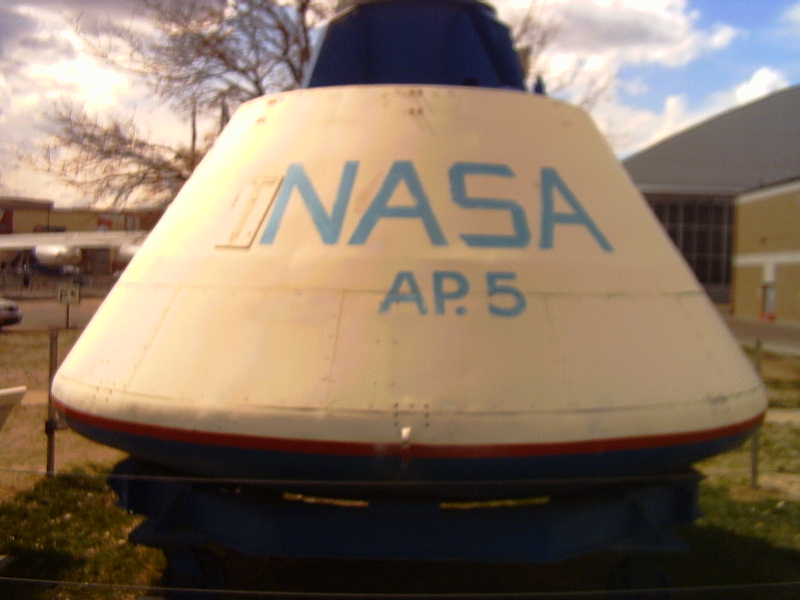
BP1101A AP5, side view

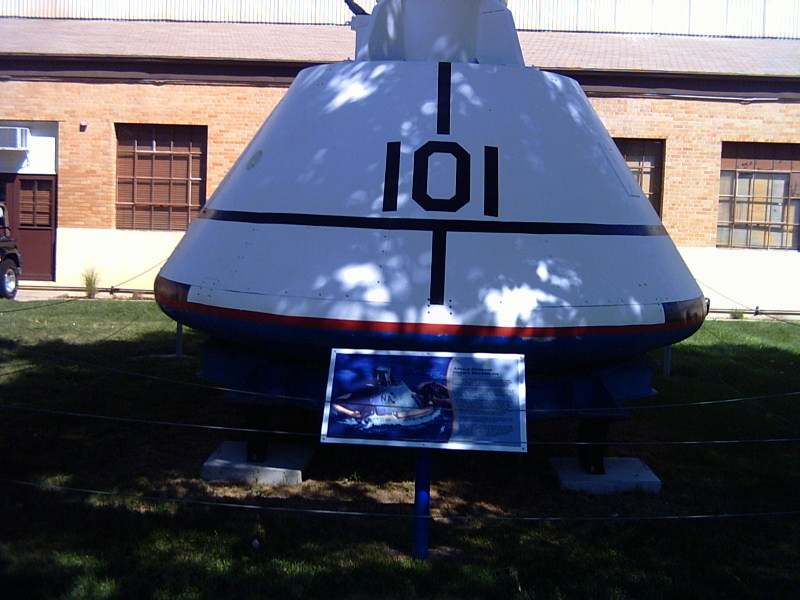
New paint scheme, June 2007

==== BP-1102A ====
BP-1102 was used for water egress trainer for all Apollo flights, including by the crew of Apollo 11, the first lunar landing mission. It was also adapted for mock-up interior components and used by astronauts to practice routine and emergency exits from the spacecraft.

It was then modified again where the interior was set up to be configured either as Apollo/Soyuz or a proposed five-person Skylab Rescue vehicle. With these two conversions, astronauts could train for those special missions. It was finally transferred from NASA to the Smithsonian in 1977, and is displayed now at the Udvar-Hazy Center with the flotation collar and bags that were attached to Columbia (the Apollo 11 Command Module) at the end of its historic mission.

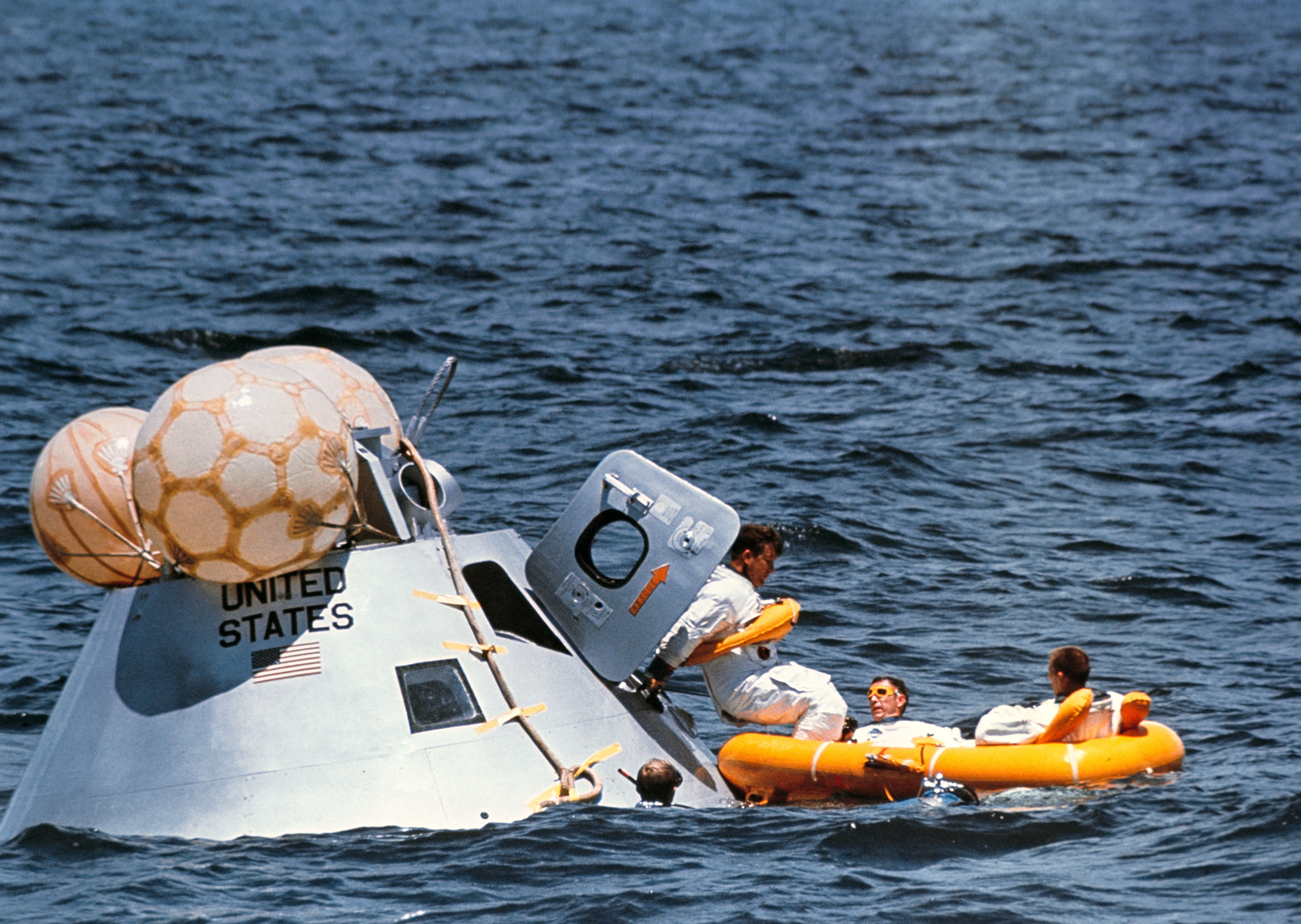
BP-1102 during Apollo 7 water egress training

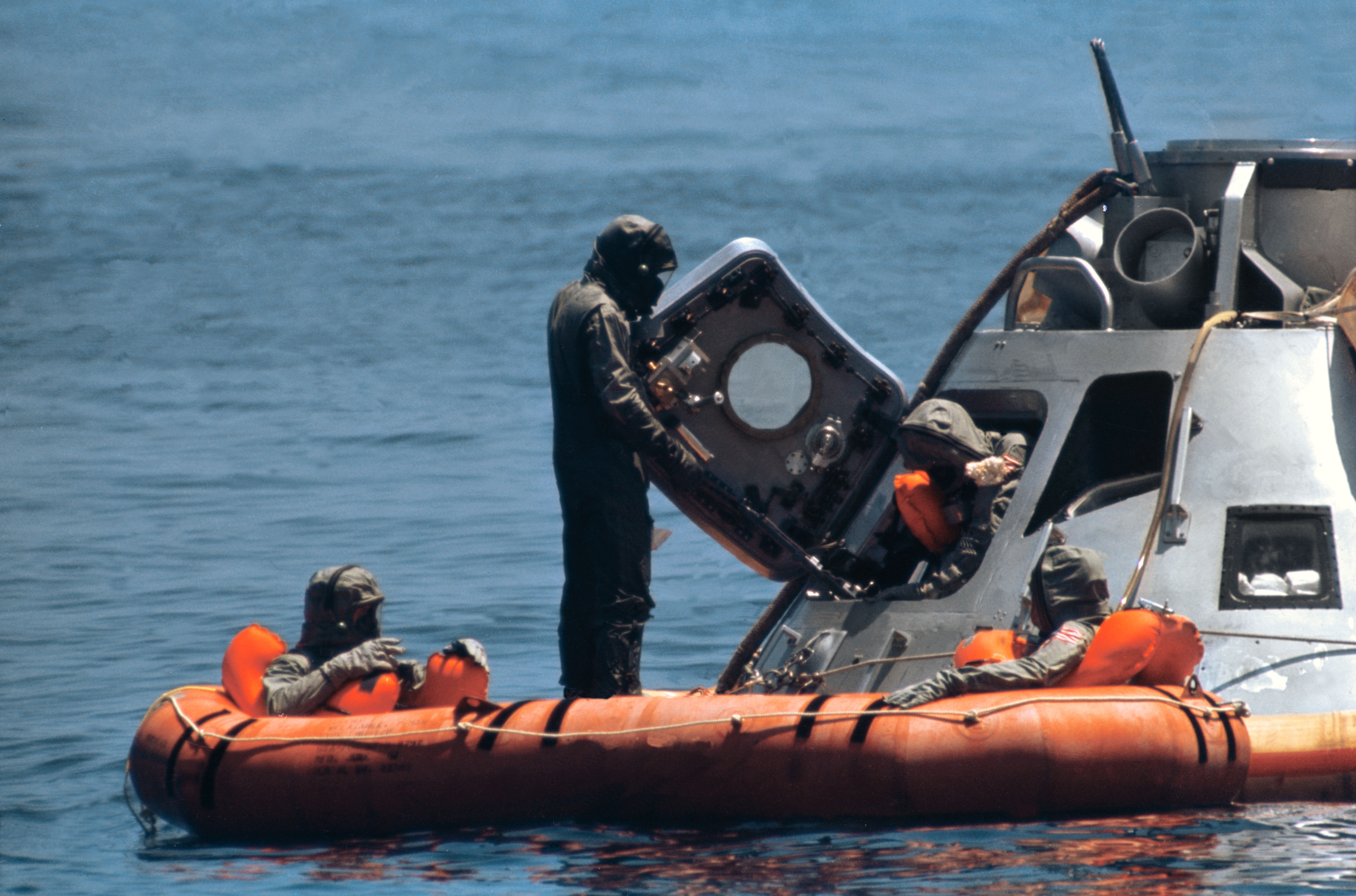
BP-1102 during Apollo 11 water egress training

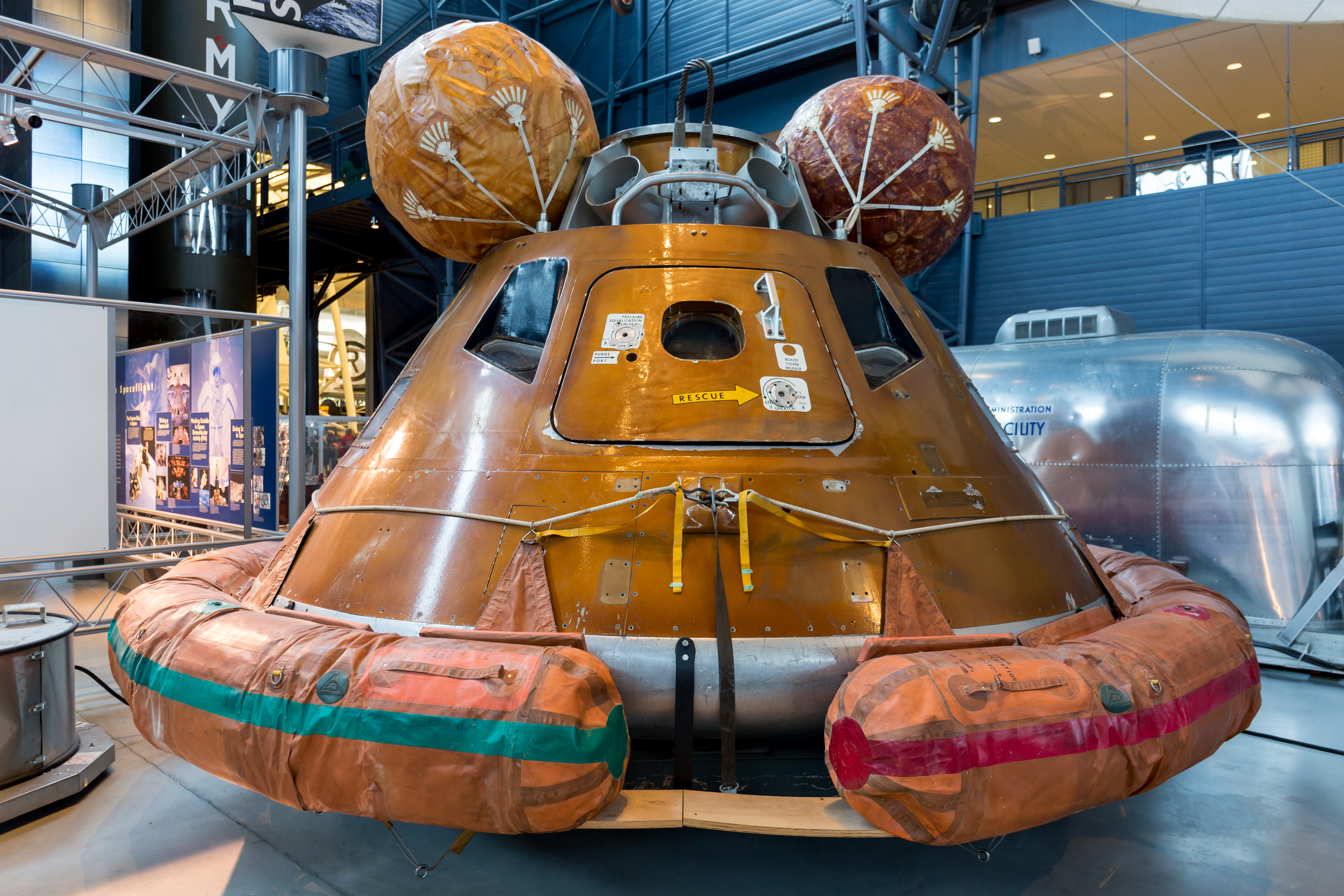
BP-1102 on display at the National Air and Space Museum Steven F. Udvar-Hazy Center.

==== BP-1210 ====
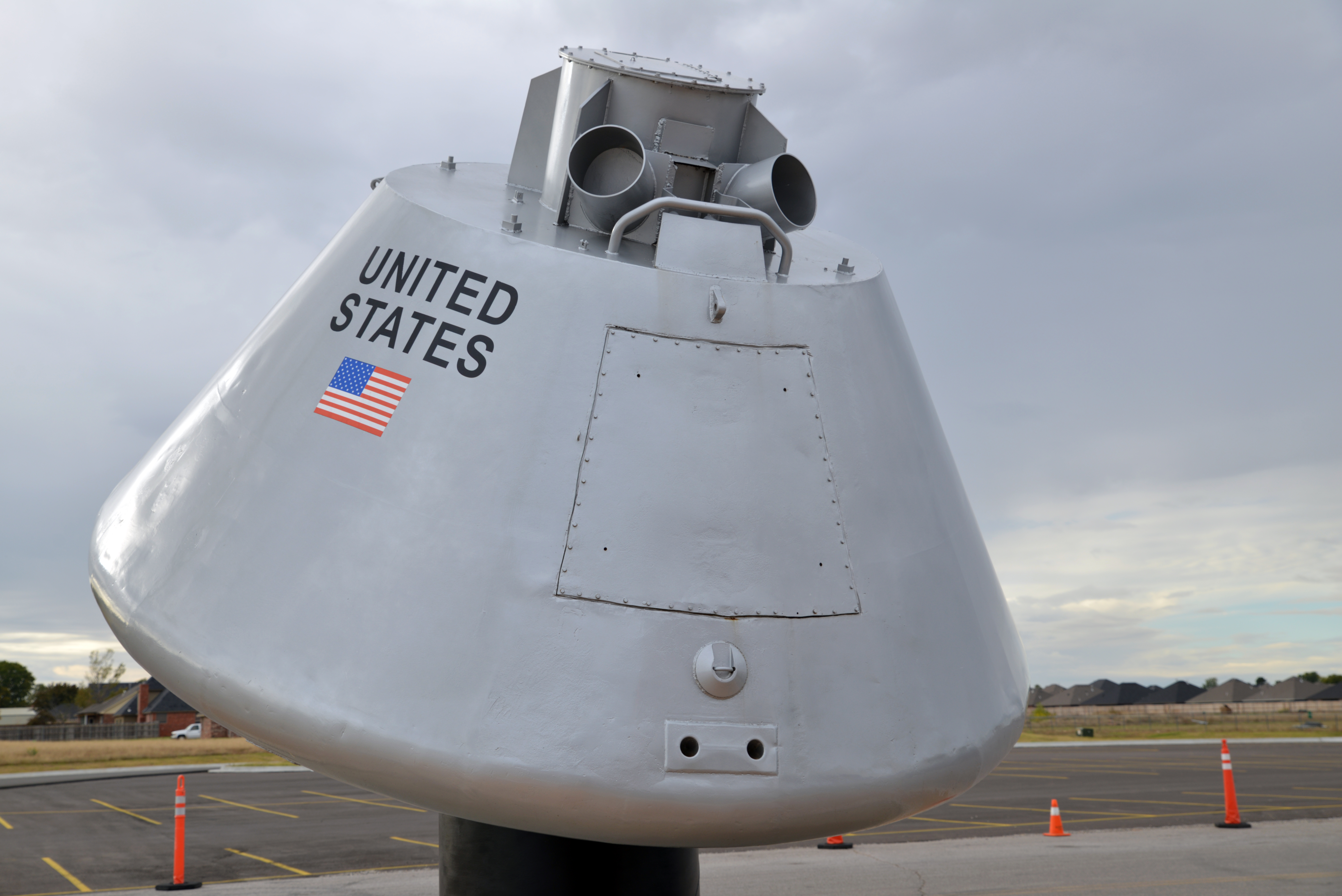
BP-1210

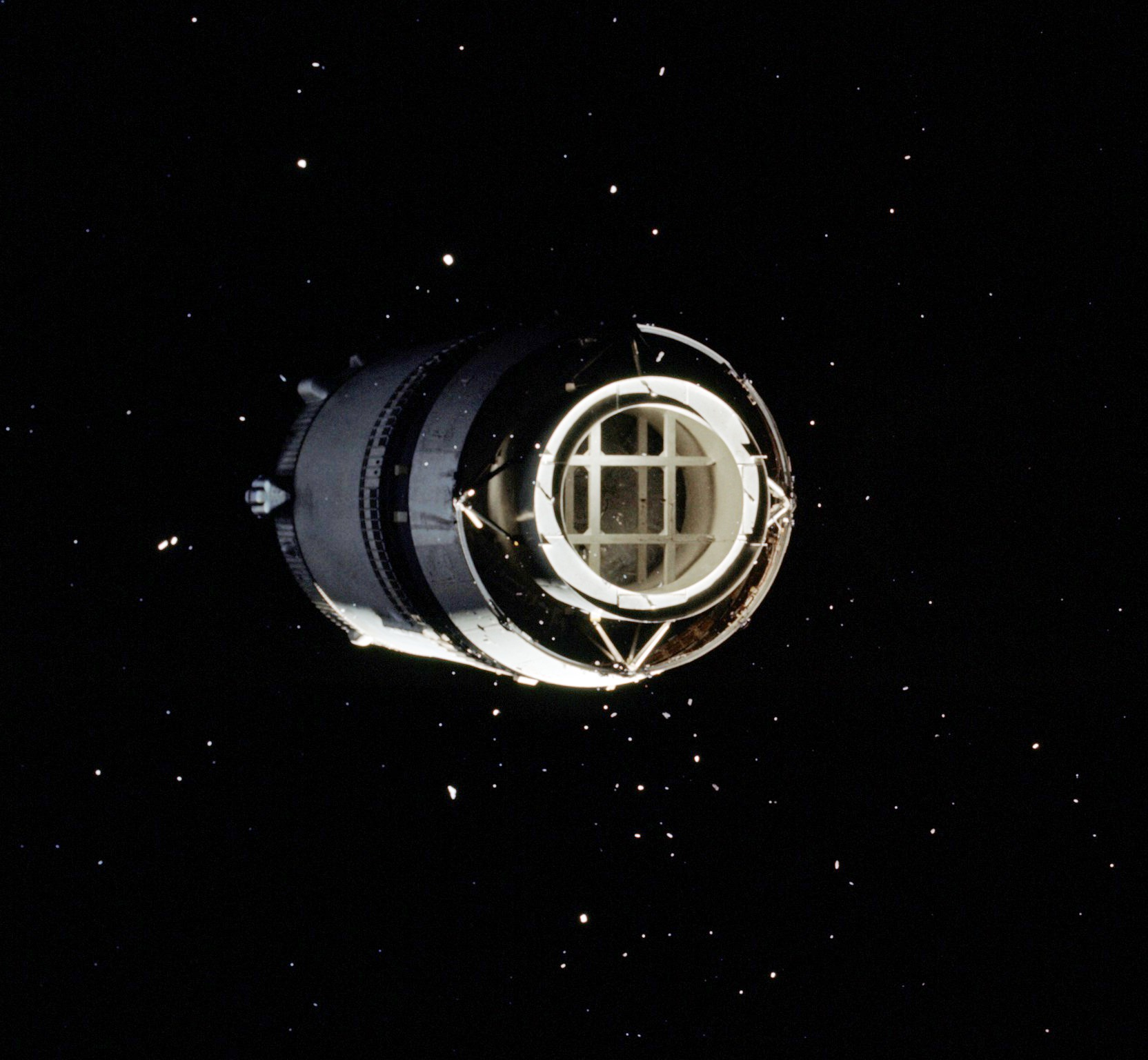
Apollo 8 S-IVB rocket stage shortly after separation. The LM test article, a circular boilerplate model of the LM is visible with four triangular legs connecting it to the stage.

BP-1210 was used in landing and recovery training and to test flotation devices. It is on display outside the Stafford Air & Space Museum.

==== BP-1220/1228 Series ====
The purpose of this series design was to simulate the weight and other external physical characteristics of the Apollo command module. These prototypes were in the 9,000 lb (4,000 kg) range for both laboratory water tanks and ocean tests. The experiments tested flotation collars, collar installations, and buoyancy characteristics. The Navy trained their recovery personnel for ocean collar installation and shipboard retrieval procedures. These boilerplates rarely had internal equipment. See BP-1220 photo.

===== BP-1224 =====
BP-1224 was a component-level flammability-test program to test for design decisions on selection and application of non-metallic materials. Boilerplate configuration comparisons with command and service module 2TV-1 and 101 were performed by North American. The NASA review board decided on February 5, 1967, that the boilerplate configuration had determined a reasonable "worst case" configuration, after more than 1,000 tests were performed. See BP-1224 photo set.

===== BP-1227 =====
Details regarding this test capsule are not clear, but most likely it was lost at sea somewhere between the Azores and the Bay of Biscay in early 1969, and recovered in June 1969 off Gibraltar by the Soviet fishing trawler Apatit (possibly a Soviet spy ship disguised as such, which was commonplace during the Cold War), transferred to the port of Murmansk in the Soviet Union, and returned to the US in September 1970 by the USCGC Southwind. It is now located in Grand Rapids, Michigan as a time capsule. See BP-1227 photo. The only certainties about this capsule are that it was returned to the United States at Murmansk early in September 1970 during a visit by the USCG Southwind who returned it to the Naval Air Station, Norfolk, Virginia. There it remained until title was passed to the Smithsonian in April 1976 when it was passed on to Grand Rapids, Michigan to serve as a time capsule. Two official sources – the US Navy and the US Coast Guard – both say that it was lost by an ARRS (Aerospace Rescue and Recovery Squadron) unit training in recovery procedures. A contemporary account of its return quotes a NASA spokesman as saying, " ... as far as NASA can determine the object... the Navy lost two years ago."

==== Apollo Lunar Module ====
A Lunar Module (LM) boilerplate, the LM test article, was launched with Apollo 8 to simulate the correct weight and balance of the LM which was not ready for the flight.

== Space Shuttle boilerplates ==
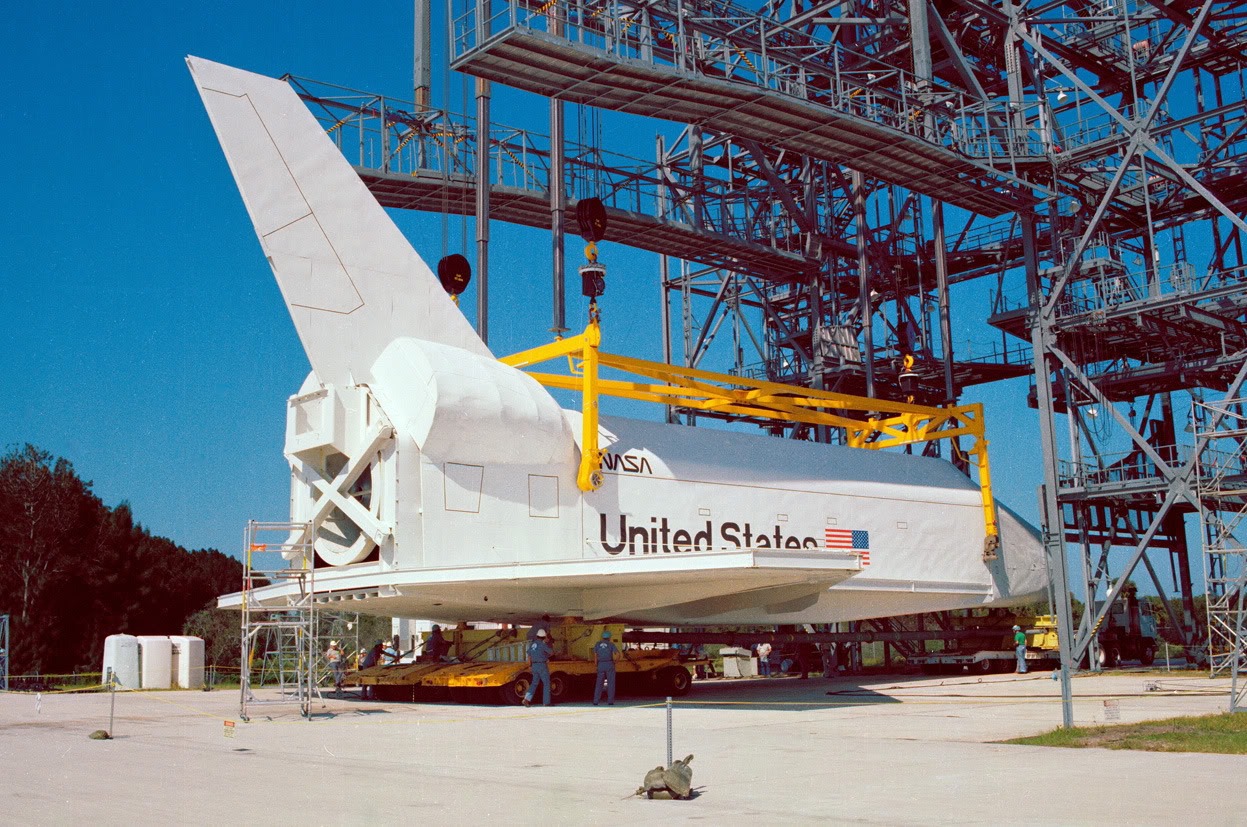
The facilities test mockup is used to test the Mate-Demate Device at the Shuttle Landing Facility in Florida

The Structural Test Article undergoing tests at the Rockwell facility in California

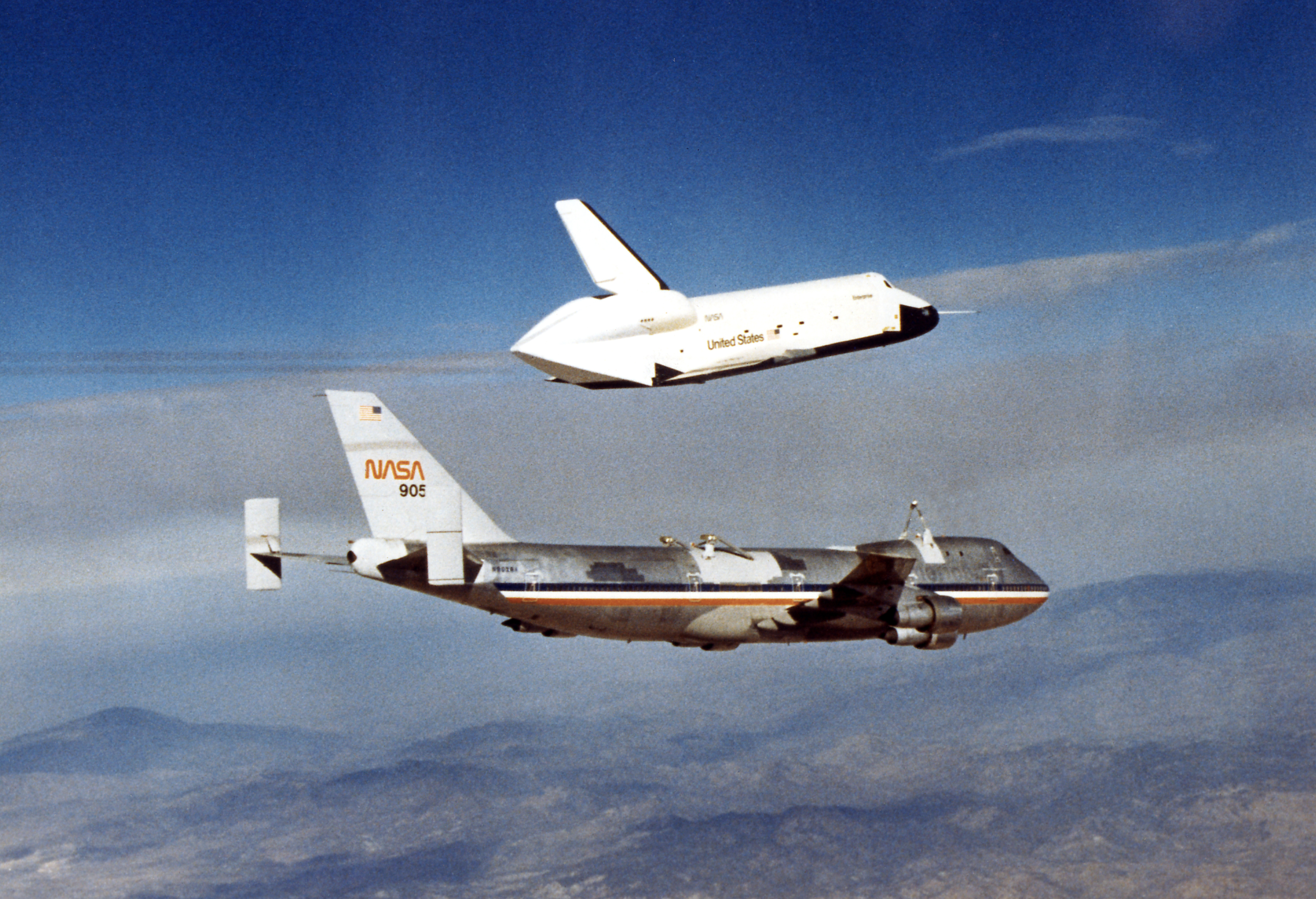
Enterprise is jettisoned from the SCA during the first free-flight of the Approach and Landing Test program

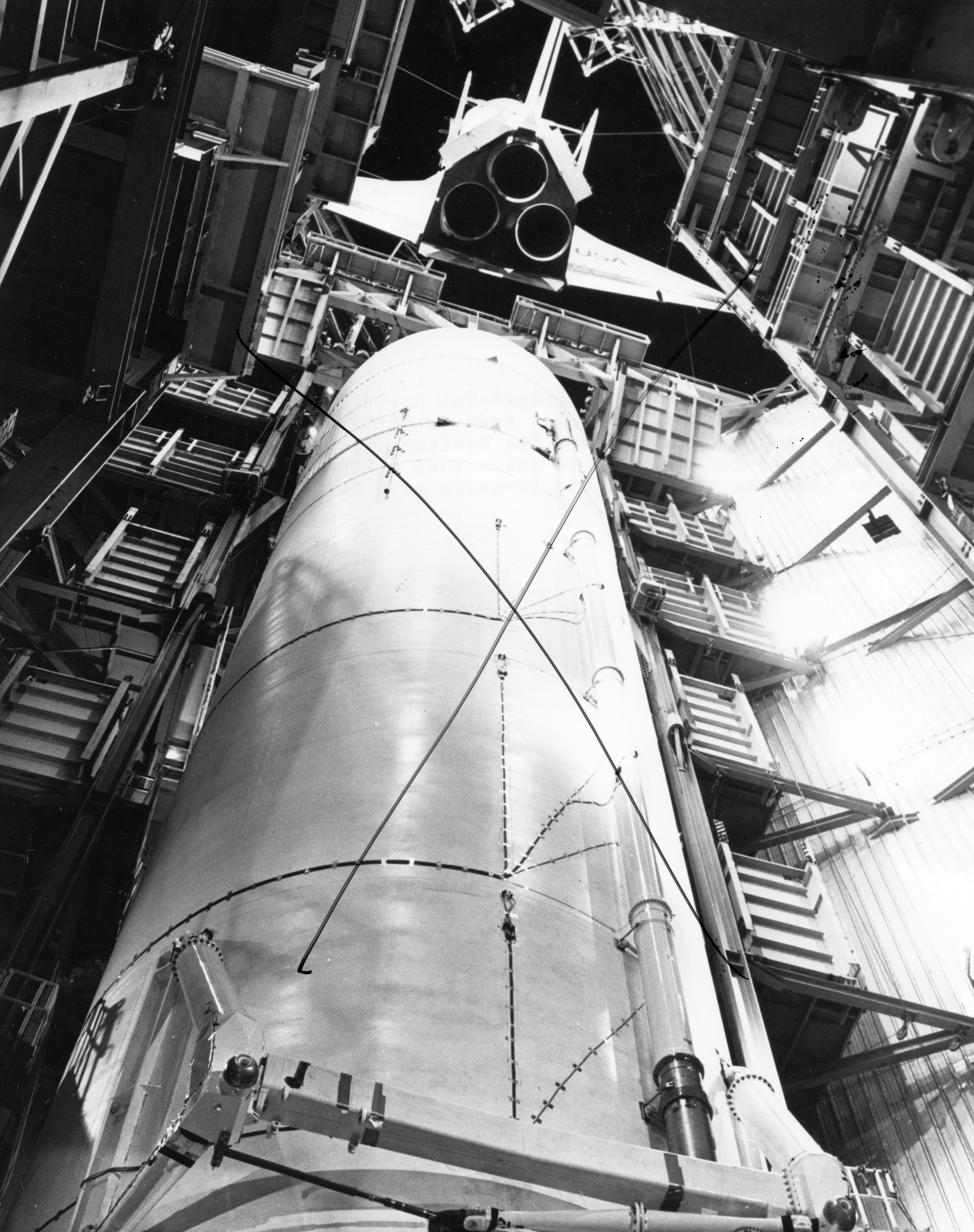
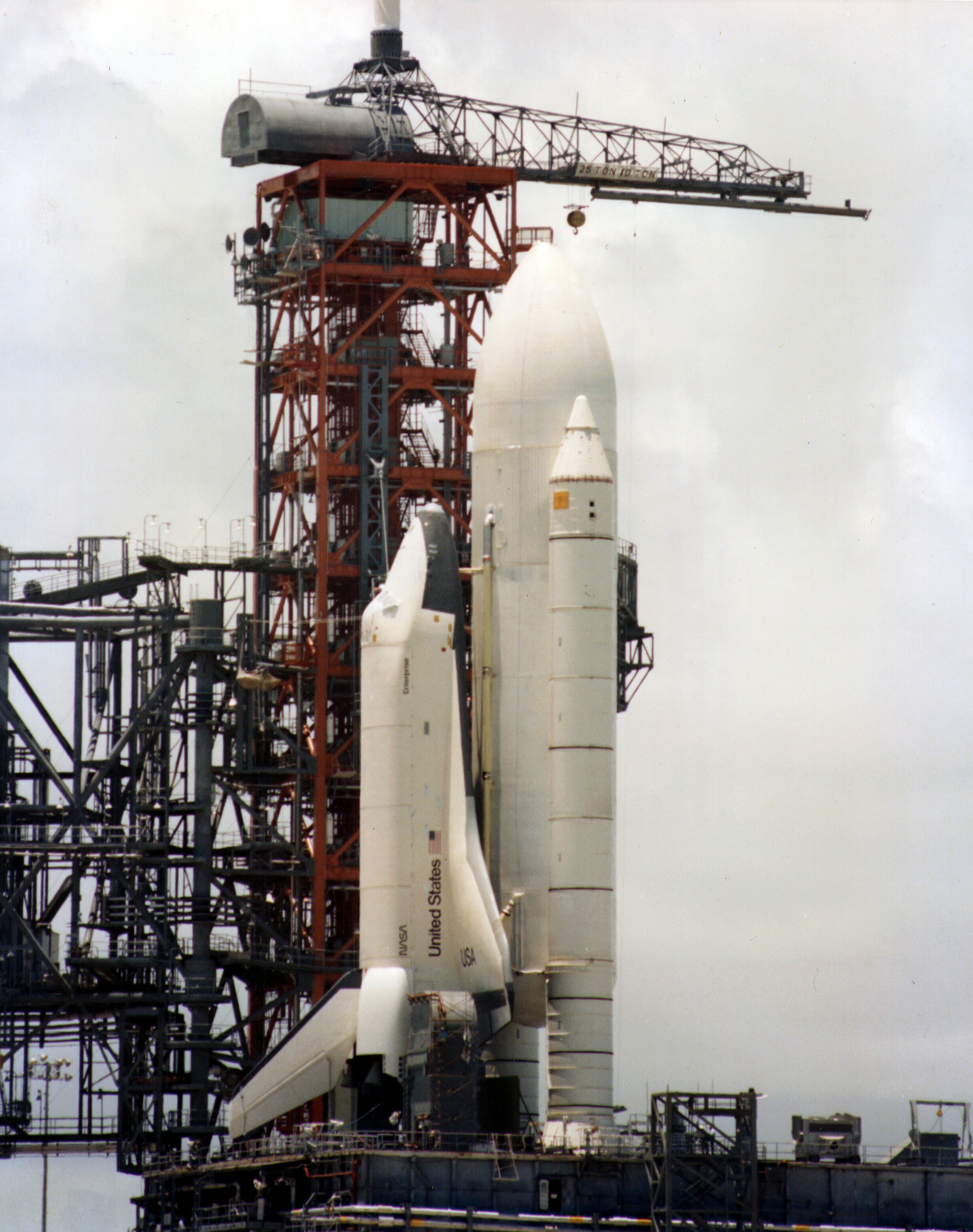
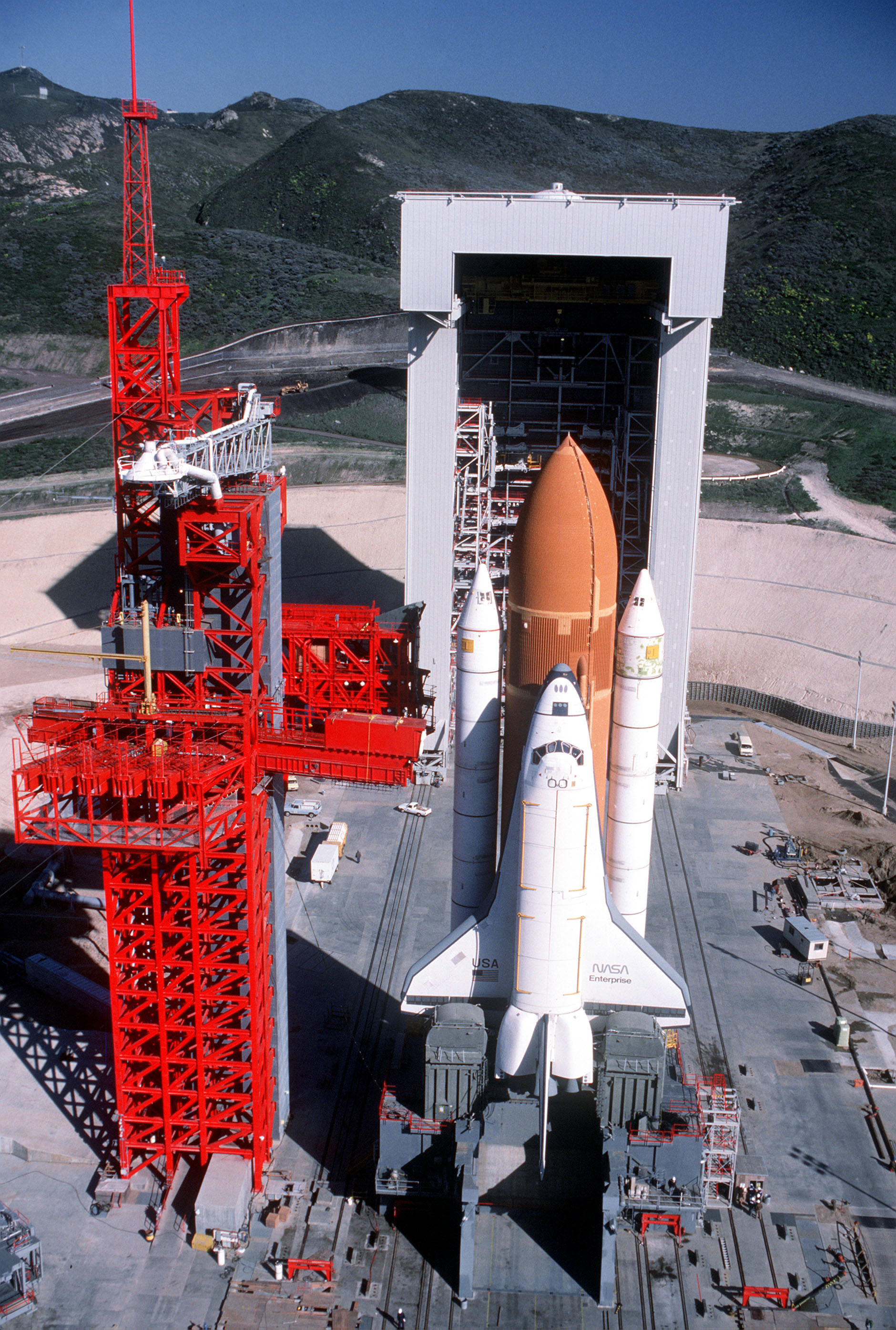
Enterprise in boilerplate configuration;
Left - Enterprise is lowered into the Dynamic Structural Test Facility for the Mated Ground Vibration Tests
Center - Enterprise is mated with ET and SRBs to undertake fit-check tests at KSC Pad 39A
Right - Enterprise with ET and SRBs in fit-check tests at SLC-6

As part of the Space Shuttle program, a number of boilerplate vehicles were constructed using various materials to undertake key tests of procedures, infrastructure and other elements that would take place during a Shuttle mission.

=== Facilities Test Article ===
In 1977, the Marshall Space Flight Center (MSFC) constructed a simple steel-and-wood orbiter mockup to be used in fit check activities for various elements of the infrastructure needed to support the Space Shuttle, including roadway clearances and crane capabilities, as well as for testing in various buildings and structures used as part of the program, both at the MSFC and at the Kennedy Space Center. The mockup was designed to be the approximate size, shape and weight of an actual orbiter, and allowed these initial tests to be undertaken without using the far more expensive and delicate prototype orbiter, Enterprise. Following its use as a test article, the mockup was stored until 1983, when it was refurbished and modified to more closely resemble an actual orbiter and named Pathfinder before being displayed in Tokyo. Following its display in Tokyo, it was returned to the U.S. and has been on display since May 1988 at the U.S. Space & Rocket Center in Huntsville, Alabama.

=== Structural Test Article ===
The Structural Test Article (STA-099) was built as a test vehicle intended for use in initial vibration testing to simulate entire flights. STA-099 was built as essentially a complete orbiter airframe, but with a mockup of the crew compartment installed, and the thermal insulation only fitted to the forward fuselage. The simulation testing of the STA was undertaken over the course of eleven months following its rollout in February 1978; at the time, it was intended that the prototype orbiter Enterprise would be converted into a full flight ready model, but the cost of undertaking this work, along with a number of design changes that had taken place between Enterprise being rolled out, and the final construction of the first operational orbiter, Columbia, meant that it was decided instead to upgrade the STA into a flight model. This began following the end of the STA testing in January 1979, with the completed orbiter, named as Challenger, rolled out in June 1982.

=== Prototype ===
==== Approach and landing tests ====
In January 1977, the prototype orbiter Enterprise was delivered to Edwards Air Force Base in California for the beginning of its overall test program, which would encompass flight tests, fit-check and procedures testing of the orbiter, its systems, the facilities and procedures required to launch, fly and land the spacecraft safely. During 1977, Enterprise was used in what was called the Approach and Landing Tests program of testing, which encompassed mating the orbiter to the Shuttle Carrier Aircraft, a modified Boeing 747 to test the taxiing and flight characteristics of the Orbiter / SCA combination. This included flights of the combination in which Enterprise itself was powered up and crewed, to test crew procedures systems in flight, and finally a set of five so-called "free-flights", with Enterprise jettisoned from the SCA at altitude to land on its own, testing the orbiter's own flying and handling characteristics.

==== Vibration and fit-check tests ====
In March 1978, following its use in flight tests during the ALT program, Enterprise was taken to the MSFC in Huntsville, Alabama for use in the Mated Vertical Ground Vibration Test. This would see Enterprise mated to an empty External Tank and dummy Solid Rocket Boosters, creating a boilerplate version of the complete Space Shuttle stack for the first time. Inside the Dynamic Structural Test Facility at the MSFC, the stack was subjected to a series of vibration tests simulating the various stages that it would be subjected to during launch.

Following its use at Huntsville, Enterprise was then taken to the Kennedy Space Center in Florida, where she was again used in full boilerplate configuration to this time test the procedures of assembling and transporting the stack from the Vehicle Assembly Building to Launch Complex 39, as well as procedures required upon its arrival at the launch pad. In 1985, Enterprise was used again for this purpose, this time with the boilerplate configuration used to test the Air Force shuttle facilities at Vandenberg Air Force Base, including a full mating on the SLC-6 launch pad.

== Orion boilerplate ==
=== Development ===
The construction of the first Orion boilerplate, was a basic mockup prototype to test the assembling sequences and launch procedures at NASA's Langley Research Center while Lockheed aerospace engineers assemble the first rocket motors for the spacecraft's escape tower. The first boilerplate went to Dryden Flight Research Center at Edwards, California, for integration of Lockheed's avionics and NASA's developmental flight instrumentation prior to shipment to New Mexico's White Sands Missile Range for the first Orion pad abort test (PA-1) in 2009. On November 20, 2008 a complete test of the abort rockets took place in Utah. PA-1 is the first of the six test events in Orion Abort Flight Test subproject. Lockheed Martin Corp. was awarded the contract to build Orion on August 31, 2006.

Other boilerplates would be used to test thermal, electromagnetic, audio, mechanical vibration conditions and research studies. These tests for the Orion spacecraft would be done at Plum Brook Station in the agency's Ohio-based Glenn Research Center.

=== Photos ===
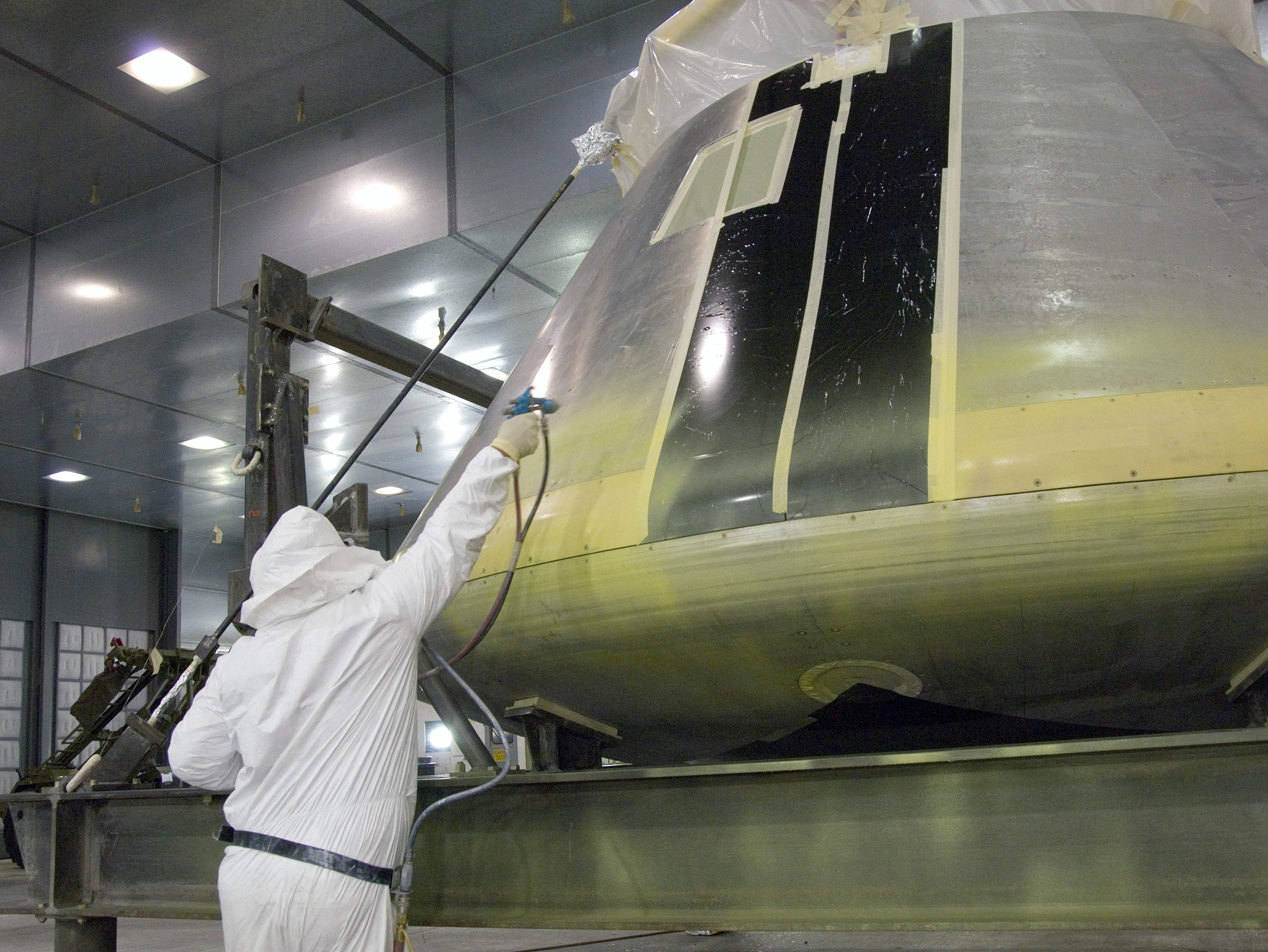
Orion full size boilerplate getting its first coat of paint

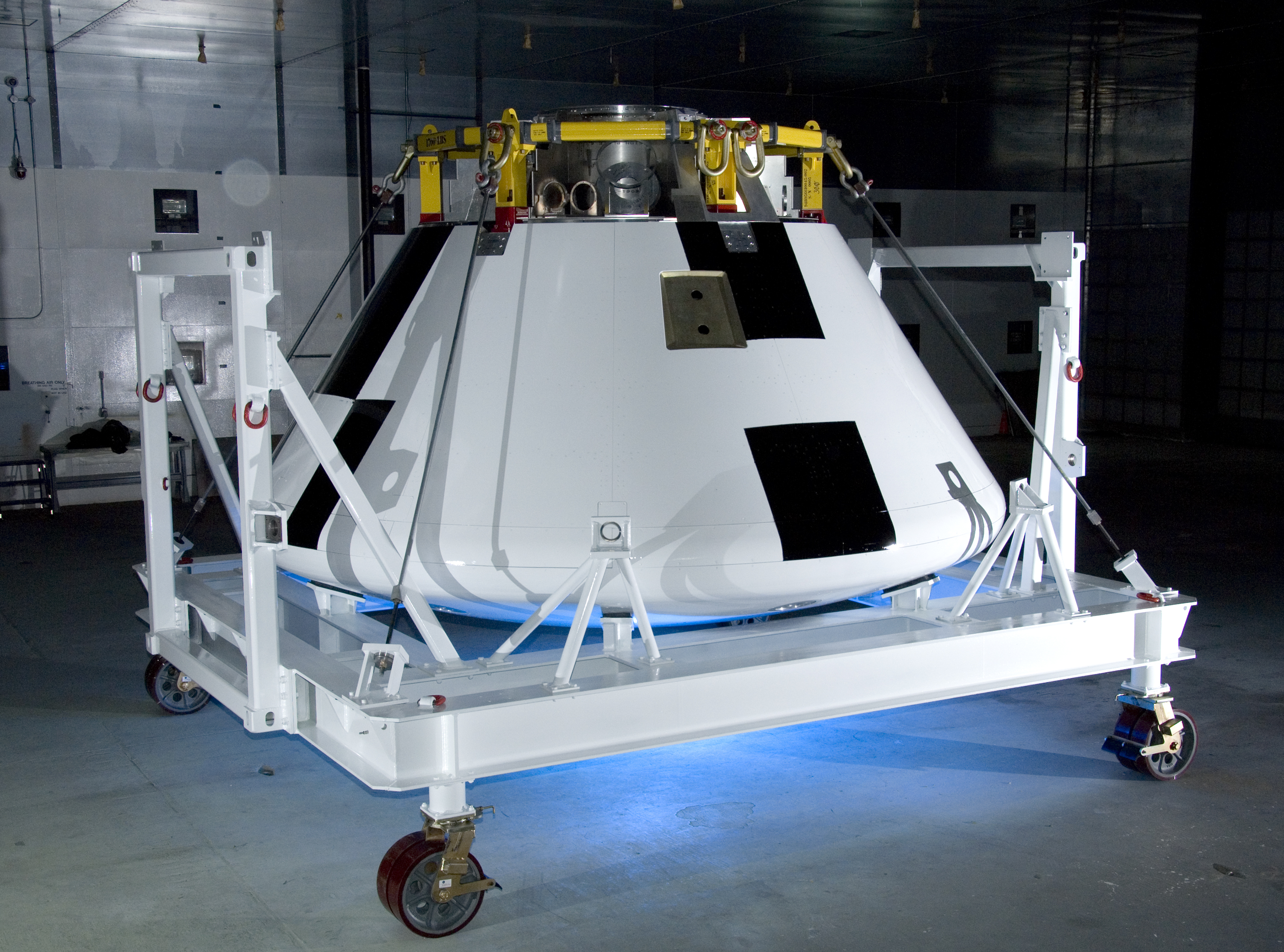
Painted at Dryden Research Center

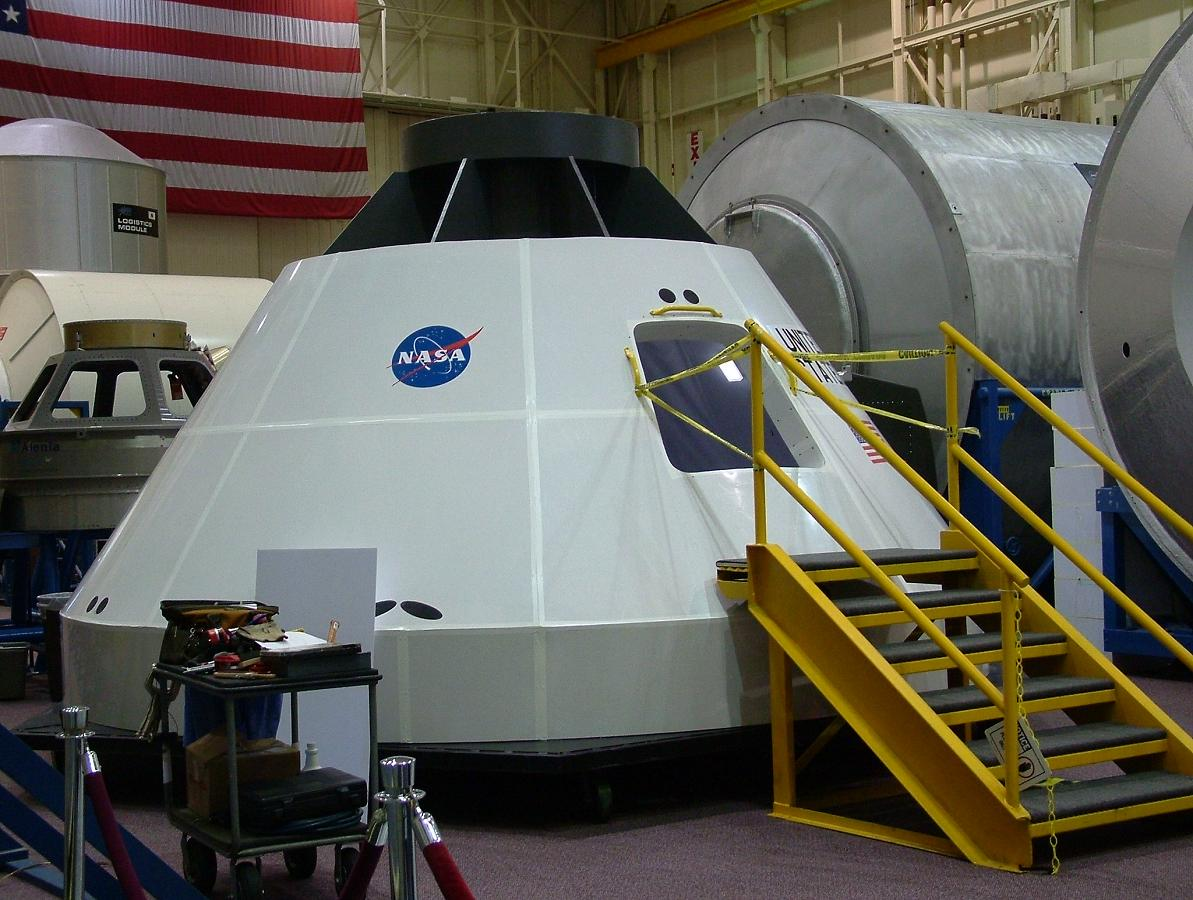
Ready for testing

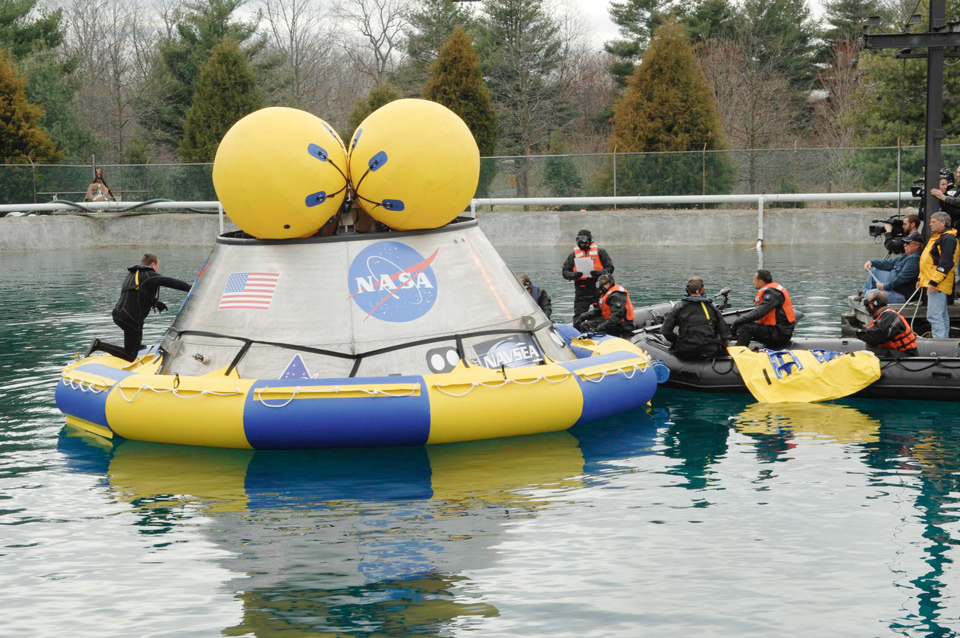
Navy-built, 18,000-pound Orion mock-up in a test pool at the Naval Surface Warfare Center's Carderock Division in West Bethesda, Maryland

== Commercial spacecraft boilerplates ==
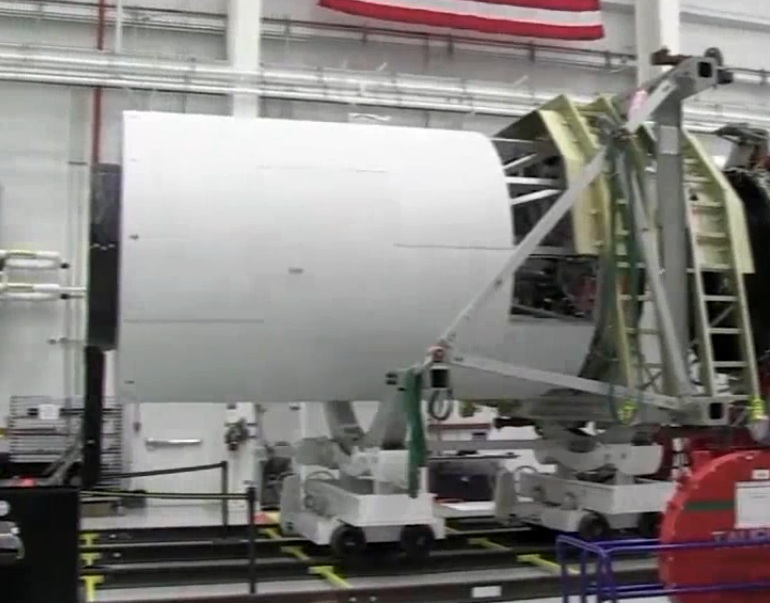
Cygnus Mass Simulator side view

In the 2010s, several commercially designed space capsules used boilerplate units on the initial launches of new launch vehicles.

- The Dragon Spacecraft Qualification Unit was a boilerplate unit launched to orbit on the maiden flight of the SpaceX Falcon 9 rocket, on June 4, 2010. It was built to the outer mold line (OML) and mass distribution of the Dragon spacecraft.
- The Cygnus Mass Simulator was a boilerplate capsule launched to orbit on the maiden flight of the Orbital Sciences Corporation Antares rocket on April 21, 2013. It was built to outer mold line and mass distribution of the Cygnus spacecraft.

== See also ==
- Project Mercury
- Project Gemini
- Project Apollo
- DemoSat
- Battleship (rocketry)
- Rendezvous Docking Simulator
- Space Shuttle Pathfinder
- Orion Abort Test Booster
