= Space Shuttle Main Propulsion Test Article =

Space Shuttle orbiter test model

Coordinates: 34.710768°N 86.65288°W

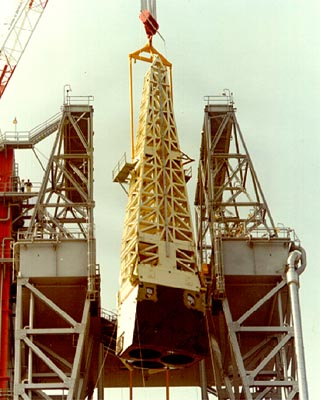
Main Propulsion Test Article being lifted onto its test stand in 1977

The Main Propulsion Test Article (MPTA-098) was built by Rockwell International as a testbed for the definitive propulsion and fuel delivery systems for the U.S. Space Shuttle Program.

== Description ==
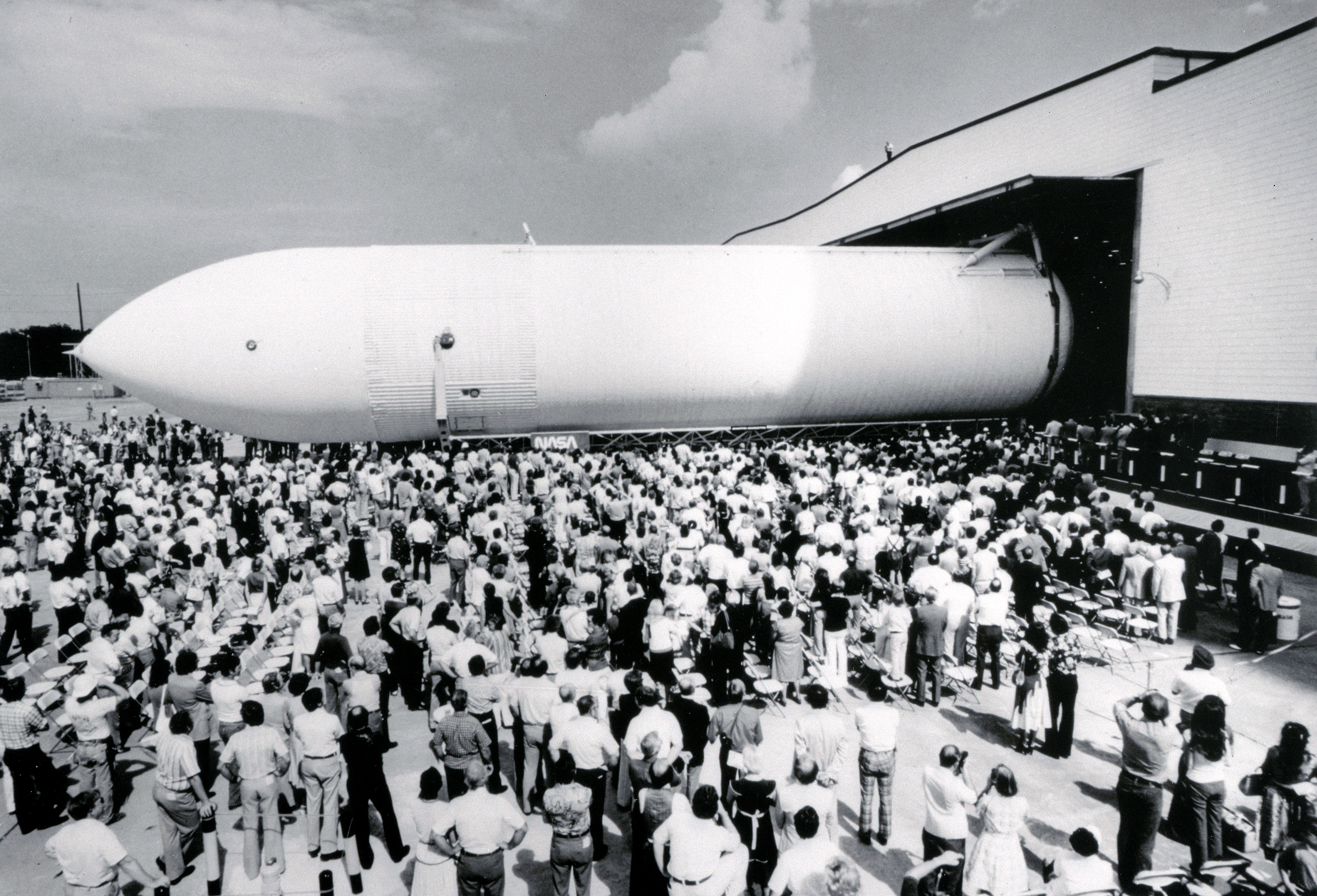
The Space Shuttle External Tank for the MPTA rolling off the assembly line at the Michoud Assembly Facility

Never intended for actual spaceflight, the MPTA consisted of the internal structure of a Space Shuttle orbiter aft-fuselage, a truss structure that simulated the basic structure and shape of an orbiter mid-fuselage and a complete Space Shuttle Main Engine (SSME) assembly, including all main propulsion system plumbing and the associated electrical systems. Later, the very different STA (Structural Test Article) was converted into a flightworthy orbiter, re-designated OV-099, and christened Challenger. Rockwell and NASA thus retroactively re-designated the MPTA as MPTA-098, though it was never christened with a name. A Space Shuttle External Tank, commonly referred to as MPTA-ET, was built to be used in conjunction with MPTA-098 for structural tests of the Space Shuttle Main Engines prior to construction of flyable craft. It rolled off the assembly line on September 9, 1977 at Michoud Assembly Facility in New Orleans, Louisiana, and was then transported to the National Space Technology Laboratories in southern Mississippi (now known as Stennis Space Center) where it was used in the static test firing of the Shuttle's cluster of three main engines.

== History ==
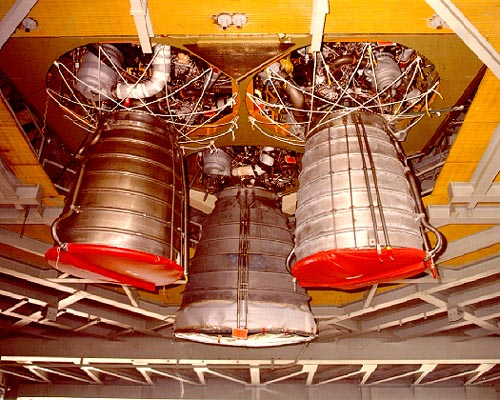
Close-up of three Space Shuttle Main Engines mounted on MPTA-098

On June 24, 1977, MPTA-098 was delivered by Rockwell International to the National Space Technology Laboratory (NSTL), in Hancock County, Mississippi, where it was mated with MPTA-ET, mounted in a launch orientation and used for static engine tests. On July 2, 1979, MPTA-098 suffered major structural damage due to a fractured fuel valve on Space Shuttle Main Engine number 2002. The fracture allowed hydrogen to leak into the enclosed aft compartment, raising the pressure to beyond the structural capability of the heat shield supports, severely damaging the structure. After extensive repairs were completed, testing resumed in September, but on November 4, a high-pressure oxidizer turbopump failed 9.7 seconds into a scheduled 510-second test. Finally, on December 17, 1979, a complete static firing was accomplished that included all three Space Shuttle Main Engines running at up to 100 percent of rated thrust for 554 seconds, exceeding the predicted maximum time that the SSMEs would burn during an operational shuttle launch.

The preliminary flight certification (PFC) program, which would clear the way for the SSMEs to be flown aboard crewed vehicles, began in early 1980. A number of setbacks, including an overheating high-pressure turbopump that shut down an engine 4.6 seconds into a 544-second test on April 16, 1980, in July, the burn-through of a hydrogen preburner cancelled a 581-second test after 105 seconds and the structural failure of a flight-rated nozzle shut down a November 1980 test after 20 seconds, slowed progress dramatically. These failures led to a number of critical changes to the SSMEs and their associated systems. In June 1980, due to the number of changes in the SSME design since the SSME installation on Columbia, the three flight-rated SSMEs (numbers 2005, 2006 and 2007) which had performed successful individual 520-second mission demonstration test firings on the NSTL SSME test stand in early 1979, were removed from OV-102, shipped to NSTL, and successfully recertified. The engines were then shipped back to Kennedy Space Center and reinstalled on Columbia. On January 17, 1981, with less than three months remaining before the scheduled STS-1 launch date, MPTA-098 successfully demonstrated a 625-second firing that included simulated abort profiles, completing the final PFC test and allowing the SSME design to be fully certified for flight, clearing the way for the launch of STS-1 on April 12, 1981.

From 1981 until 1988, the MPTA-098 and MPTA-ET remained in-situ on the NSTL test stand, unused. In late 1988, the Essex Corporation used the thrust structure of the MPTA as the basis for an engineering development model for the proposed Shuttle-C launch vehicle. The model was used by NASA and Boeing at Kennedy Space Center and the Marshall Space Flight Center to conduct fit-checks and manufacturing engineering studies. The Shuttle-C program was cancelled by the United States Congress in 1990 and the model was disassembled. Today, the Main Propulsion Test Article, without truss work, is on display at the U.S. Space & Rocket Center, Visitor Information Center for NASA's Marshall Space Flight Center in Huntsville, Alabama, alongside the External Tank, which is mounted under the refurbished Pathfinder orbiter simulator and has two Advanced Solid Rocket Booster casings to produce a complete Space Shuttle stack.

== Timeline ==
=== Construction ===
- July 26, 1972 – Contract award
- July 17, 1974 – Start of long-lead fabrication
- June 24, 1975 – Start structural assembly of aft-fuselage
- January 23, 1976 – Truss on dock at Rockwell Downey
- March 17, 1976 – Complete premate at Downey and delivered to Palmdale
- May 3, 1976 – Complete proof load test setup at Palmdale
- June 29, 1976 – Move truss assembly from Palmdale Building 294 to 295
- July 8, 1976 – MPTA-098 on dock at Downey
- July 12, 1976 – Start of Final Assembly
- July 24, 1976 – Complete MPTA-098 proof load test
- May 27, 1977 – Completed Final Assembly, Transport to Seal Beach
- June 3, 1977 – Transport from Seal Beach to NSTL
- June 24, 1977 – Arrival at NSTL for static firing
- September 10, 1977 – Arrival of MPTA-ET at NSTL

=== Test firings ===
- April 21, 1978 – 1st static firing (2.5 sec)
- May 19, 1978 – 2nd static firing (15 sec)
- June 15, 1978 – 3rd static firing (50 sec)
- July 7, 1978 – 4th static firing (100 sec)
- May 4, 1979 – 5th static firing flight nozzles (1.5 sec)
- June 12, 1979 – 5th static firing flight nozzles (54 sec)
- October 24, 1979 – 6th static firing flight nozzles (scrubbed)
- November 4, 1979 – 6th static firing flight nozzles (10 sec cutoff)
- December 17, 1979 – 6th static firing non-flight (554 sec)
- February 28, 1980 – 7th static firing non-flight (555 sec)
- March 28, 1980 – 8th static firing non-flight (539 sec)
- April 16, 1980 – 9th static firing non-flight (4.6 sec cutoff)
- May 30, 1980 – 9th static firing non-flight (565 sec cutoff)
- July 12, 1980 – 10th static firing flight nozzles (105 sec shutdown)
- November 3, 1980 – 11th static firing flight nozzles (20 sec shutdown)
- December 4, 1980 – 11th static firing non-flight (591 sec)
- January 17, 1981 – 12th static firing flight nozzles (625 sec)

== See also ==
- Boilerplate
- Space Shuttle main engine
