= Mike Wing =

American author and sports coach

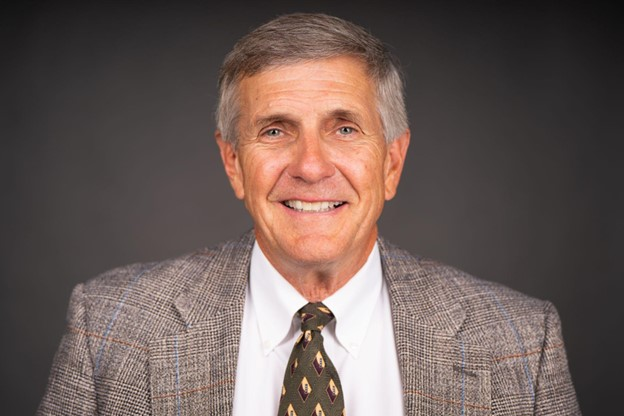
- Mike Wing
- Born: July 1, 1959 (age 67)
- Occupations: author, baseball and basketball coach
- Conviction: wire fraud parole violation

Michael “Mike” James Wing (born July 1, 1959) is a former attorney, educator, and nonprofit executive. He served as executive director of the U.S. Space & Rocket Center in Huntsville, Alabama, from 1998 to 1999. His tenure ended in resignation after financial problems and controversy surrounding fundraising practices. In 2007 he was convicted in federal court of wire fraud and sentenced to prison. He has since worked intermittently in education and sports programs.

From 1992 to 1993, he served President George H. W. Bush as a White House Fellow.

Wing is also an author. He wrote book Talking With Your Customers: What They Will Tell You About Your Business.. He and his wife, Victoria Junkins, co-authored two additional books: The Wisdom and Insight of Matthew Henry and The Incarceration Explosion: We Must Do Better.

Wing has three children and two stepchildren with his wife, Victoria.

== Biography ==
=== Early life ===
Michael Wing was raised in Tucson, Arizona. His father, James Wing, was the coach of the University of Arizona Wildcats baseball team. Michael Wing later coached USA Baseball. He played baseball in his freshman year at the University of Arizona under his dad, coach James Wing in 1977–78. In 1979, he transferred to the University of Colorado on a baseball scholarship to finish out his remaining three years of eligibility, serving as the team captain. While at Colorado, he was selected to a U.S. collegiate all-star team that competed internationally for the World Cup. His last year of eligibility, he was asked to serve as the Head Baseball Coach at the University of Colorado while also remaining as a player. At the age of 20, he was considered one of the youngest head coaches of an NCAA Division I sport in NCAA history. Colorado shut down the Baseball program in 1981. In 1980, he was asked to be a player-coach for the Swedish National Baseball Team, Leksand where he led them to the 1980 European Cup championship, their first championship in 43 years.

=== Early career ===
Wing worked as a White House Fellow from 1992 to 1993. In 1993, Dearborn Financial Publishing of Chicago printed his book Talking With Your Customers: What They Will Tell You About Your Business, and Arthur Andersen signed on to another printing in 1997.

=== College sports coach ===
Wing served as baseball coach for LeTourneau Athletics from 2002 to 2003 while the team posted 35 wins to 47 losses.

=== High school coach ===
Wing took a job as coach at Ranier High School in 2016, and left that job on account of a parole violation 14 months later.

In 2019, Wing took a position as and then resigned as coach from coaching baseball at remote rural Idaho West Jefferson High School where he had pledged to raise millions for a baseball complex while having 13 players on the team.

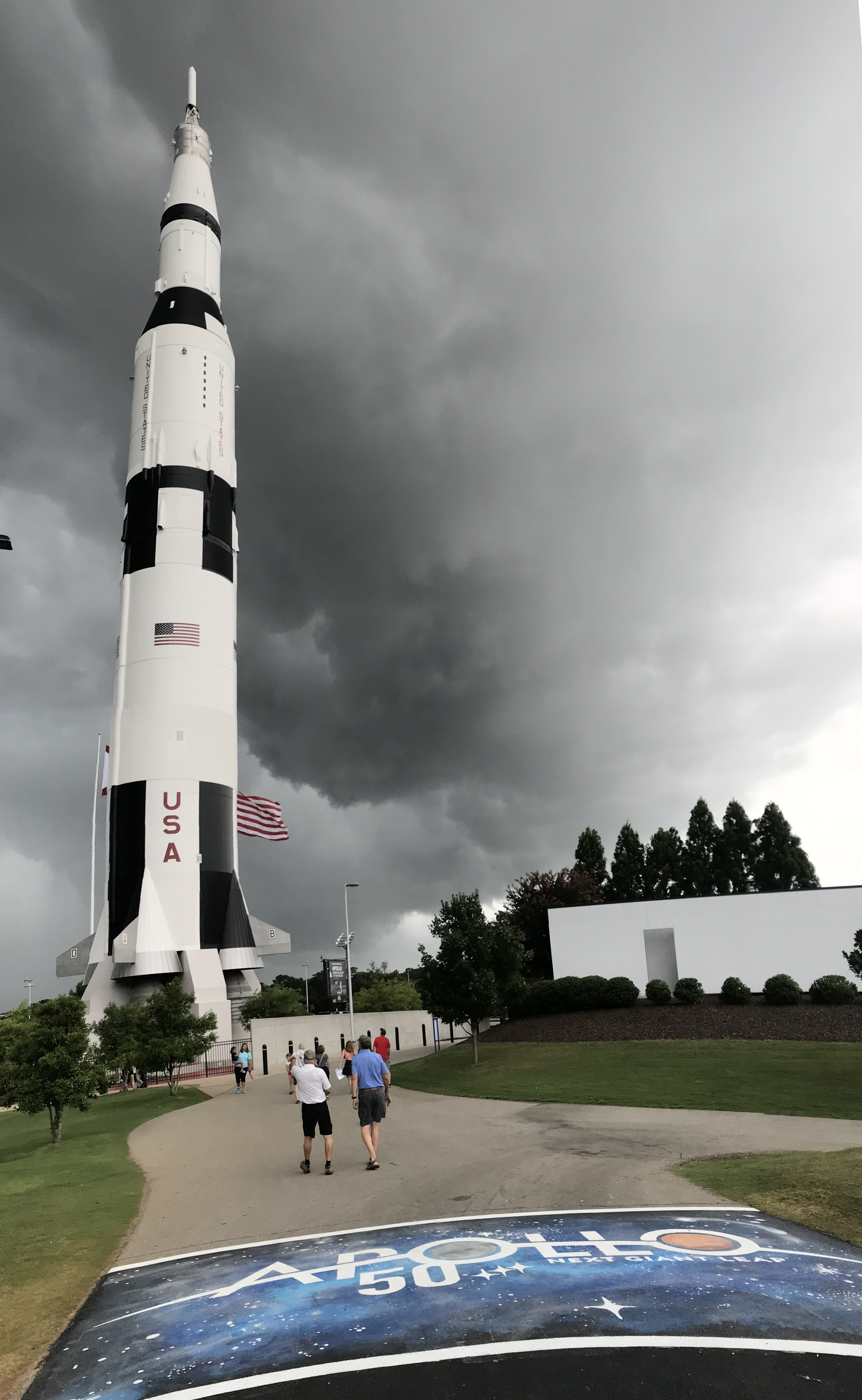
Wing cast a shadow of debt over the U.S. Space and Rocket Center and erected a unique landmark.

=== U.S. Space and Rocket Center ===
Wing served as executive director of the U.S. Space and Rocket Center from 1998 to 1999, where he plunged the center into debt. Wing oversaw construction of a full-scale vertical Saturn V replica to be finished at by the 30th anniversary of the Apollo 11 moon landing, July 1999. It serves as a towering landmark in Huntsville, and cost the center $8.6 million of borrowed money. The Huntsville Times estimated interest costs at $10 million. Wing also sought to create a program for fifth grade students in Alabama and elsewhere to attend Space Camp at no cost to them. Anonymous corporate pledges that Wing promised would fund the $800 per student never arrived. Wing prolonged the Alabama Space Science Exhibit Commission's investigation into the pledges by writing bogus personal checks and having the center record them as received. The program ultimately cost the center $7.5 million. Wing was pressured to resign, and several members of the governing Alabama Space Science Exhibit Commission were ousted from that board as a result of the debacle. At the end of Wing's term as director, the center was $26 million in debt. The state sued Wing for $7.5 million over the Space Camp fraud. They settled for $500,000.

=== Texas attorney ===
Wing's next position was as an attorney in Tyler, Texas. He was licensed to practice in Texas from September 2000 until his resignation from the bar in February 2008. Leveraging his position as attorney and the skill and trust afforded because of same, Wing offered to his victims that they could invest in bridge loans that did not exist. Instead of a bridge loan, he used the monies from those accounts and others to pay off prior "investors" and for his own purposes. Wing resigned from the State Bar of Texas after pleading guilty to wire fraud.

=== Criminal proceedings ===
Wing was arrested on April 12, 2006, and charged with 18 counts of wire fraud underlying a scheme to defraud investors by offering high returns on investments for bridge loans among companies which he declined to name citing insider trading rules. He pleaded guilty to at least one count of wire fraud and was sentenced to 10 years in federal prison, 3 years of probation, and $9.2 million ($13.71 million in current dollars) in restitution. He was released from prison on probation in 2014.

In 2017, Wing was sentenced to 6 months in prison for a parole violation brought on by taking out loans without informing parole officers.

== Published works ==
Wing has authored these books:

- Talking with Your Customers: What They Will Tell You about Your Business when You Ask the Right Questions, published by Enterprise Dearborn in 1993. A 1997 edition included input from Arthur Andersen and added information about the internet.
- The Incarceration Explosion: We Must Do Better (Hardcover – June 11, 2024), co-authored with Victoria Junkins, discusses the societal impacts of mass incarceration and offers strategies for reform.
- The Wisdom and Insight of Matthew Henry: Helping Modern Christians Strengthen Their Walk with God (Kindle Edition), co-authored with Victoria
