= Space Shuttle Pathfinder =

Space Shuttle test simulator

Coordinates: 34.71079°N 86.65280°W

Pathfinder
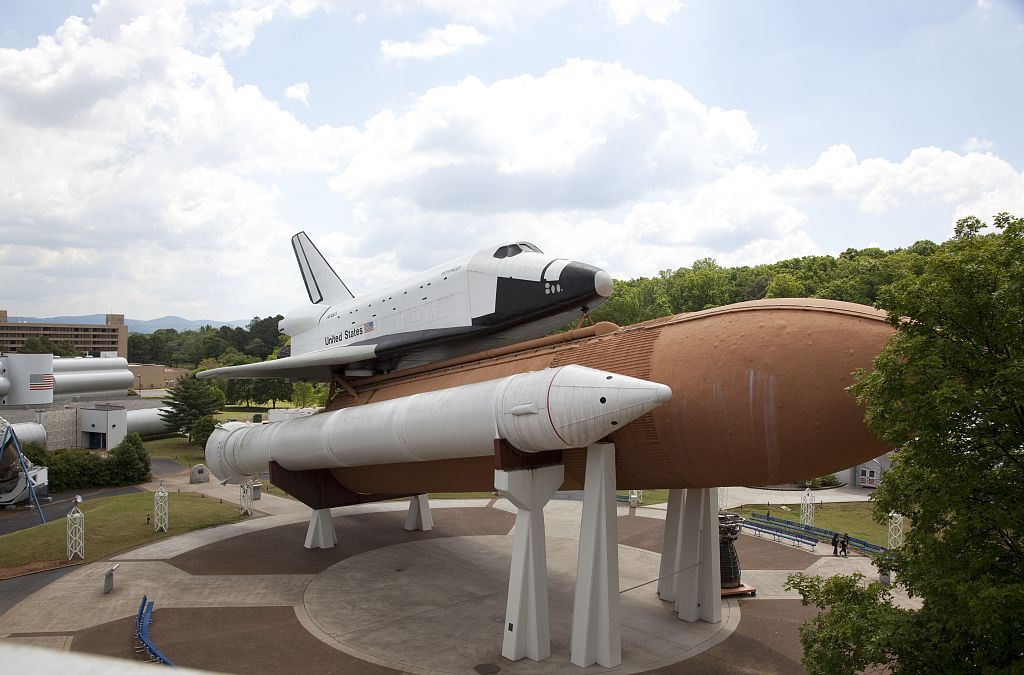
- Pathfinder at the U.S. Space & Rocket Center in Alabama sits atop MPTA-ET in 2010. The SRB forward assemblies have changed over the years.
- Type: Space Shuttle test simulator
- Construction number: OV-098
- Country: United States
- Status: Retired; on display at the U.S. Space & Rocket Center, Huntsville, Alabama
- No. of missions: 6 tests

The Space Shuttle Pathfinder (unofficial Orbiter Vehicle Designation: OV-098) is a Space Shuttle replica. It originated as STA-098, a test article constructed by NASA in 1977 out of wood and steel to test ground clearances and handling. It was purchased in the early 1980s by the America-Japan Society, Inc. which had it refurbished, named it, and placed it on display in the Great Space Shuttle Exhibition in Tokyo. The mockup was later returned to the United States and placed on permanent display at the U.S. Space & Rocket Center in Huntsville, Alabama, in May 1988.

== Activities as test article ==
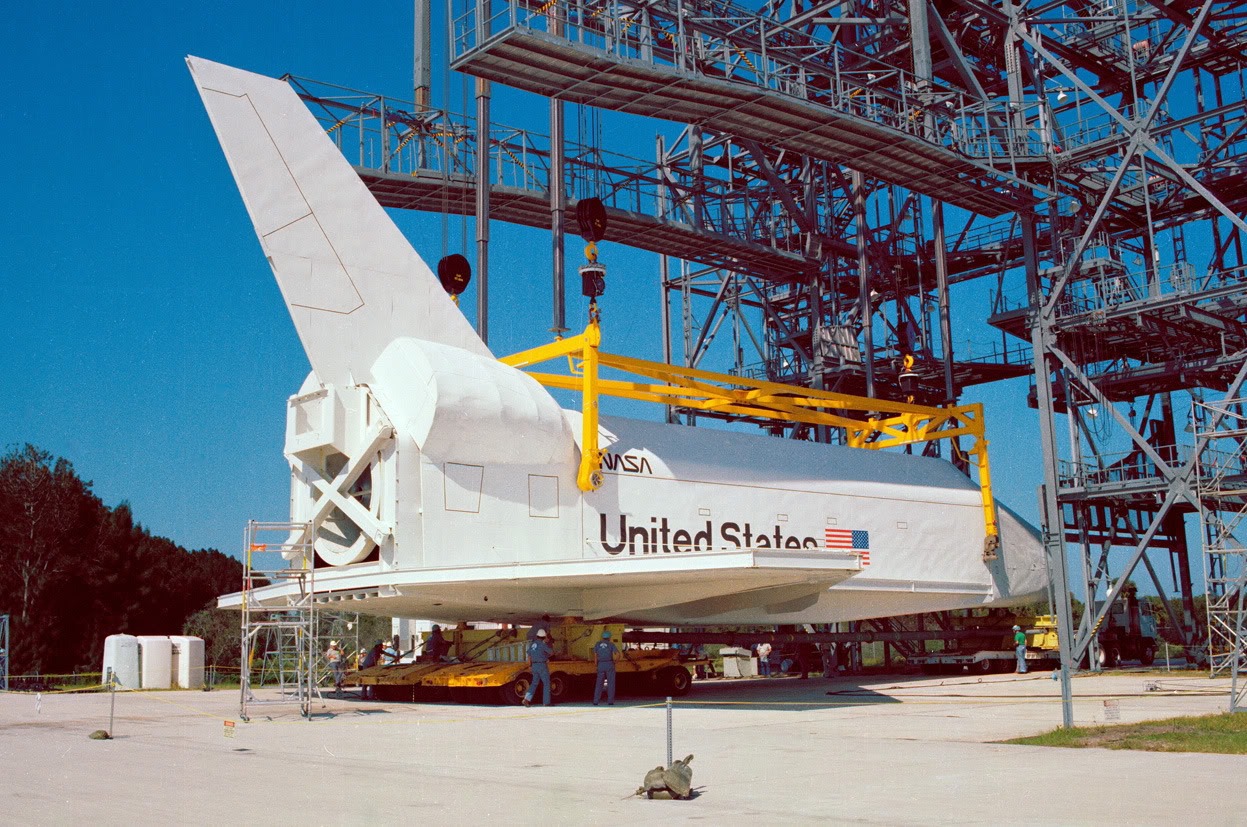
STA-098 on the Mate-Demate Device at the Shuttle Landing Facility in 1978

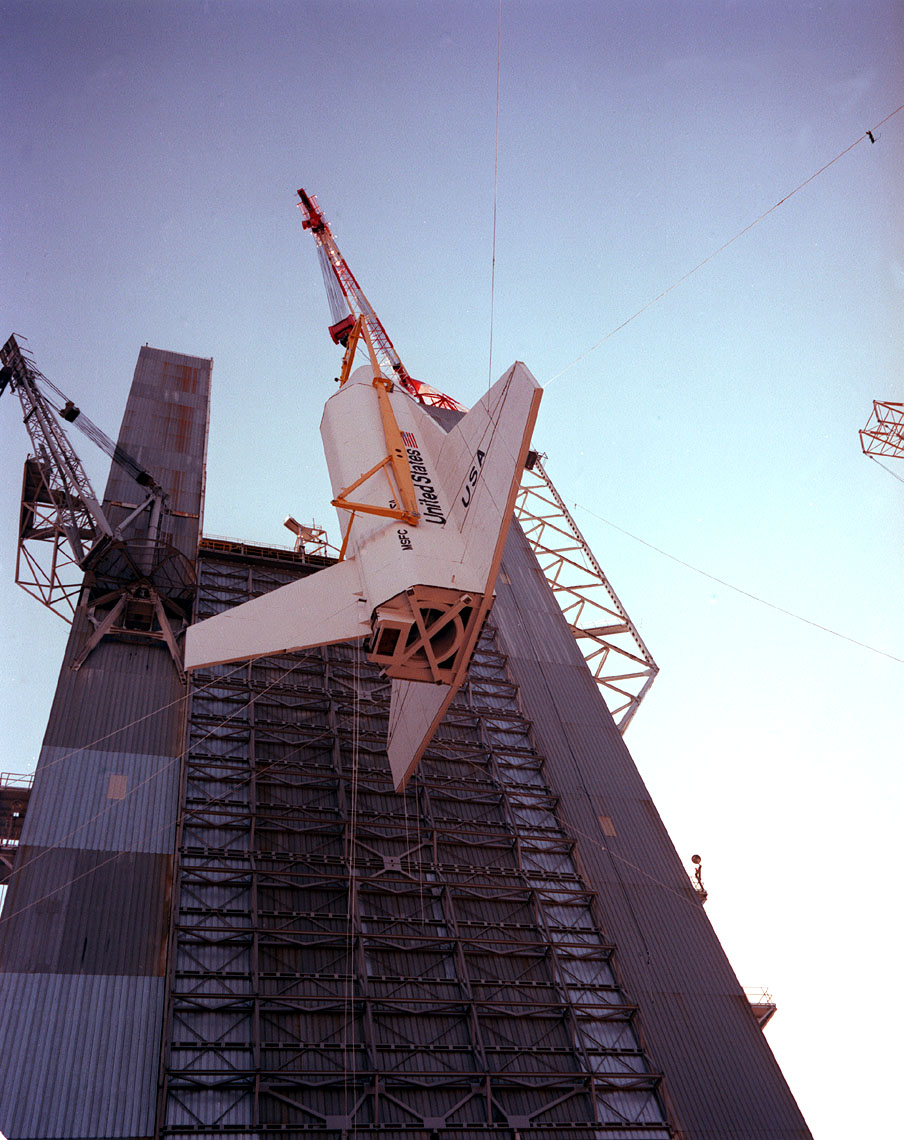
The orbiter boilerplate is hoisted into the Saturn V Dynamic Test Stand at NASA's Marshall Space Flight Center.

Originally unnamed, the simulator was built at the Marshall Space Flight Center in 1977 for use in activities such as checking roadway clearances, crane capabilities and fits within structures. It was later shipped by barge to the Kennedy Space Center and was used for ground crew testing in the Vehicle Assembly Building, Orbiter Processing Facility, and Shuttle Landing Facility. Pathfinder is approximately the same size, shape and weight of an actual orbiter. Using Pathfinder allowed for facilities testing without requiring use of the more delicate and expensive Enterprise.

== Refurbishment ==
After sitting in storage for many years, the America-Japan Society, Inc. obtained the wood and steel mockup at a cost of US$1 million and hired Teledyne Brown Engineering to refurbish it to more closely resemble an actual Space Shuttle. It was named Pathfinder and displayed at the Great Space Shuttle Exposition in Tokyo from June 1983 to August 1984. Teledyne Brown contracted RTS Laboratories, Inc., which had previously built a replica of the shuttle cockpit for training purposes at the Marshall Space Flight Center, to design and reconstruct the nose cone and cockpit section of the shuttle's hull.

== U.S. Space & Rocket Center ==
After the exhibit, Pathfinder returned to the United States. The U.S. Space & Rocket Center in Huntsville, Alabama designed the display and built a stand. NASA provided MPTA-ET, an external tank which had been used for propulsion tests with the MPTA-098 engine testing rig, and two filament-wound Solid Rocket Booster casings, which had been designed for polar-orbit launches from Vandenberg Air Force Base. The tank, not having been designed to hold the weight of an orbiter at an angle, required reinforcements. NASA installed I-beam spokes in the tank at Marshall, in building 4705. Pathfinder's weight is concentrated in the tail, though, and the tank required further reinforcements. In May 1988, the 89-ton Pathfinder was installed atop the display at the Space & Rocket Center.

In 1999, NASA removed the forward assemblies from each SRB attached to the Pathfinder stack. Although the SRBs are recovered and reused after each flight, several of the forward assemblies had been damaged or lost over the history of the Space Shuttle program necessitating requisition of those attached to the Pathfinder stack as spares.

In 2008, repairs were made to the forward part of the mockup after decades of exposure to the weather had corroded the floor section near the vehicle's nose. This corrosion caused the "belly pan" to drop from a mounting bracket onto the external tank. The damaged area was part of the fiberglass and plywood added to the mockup before its exhibition in Japan.

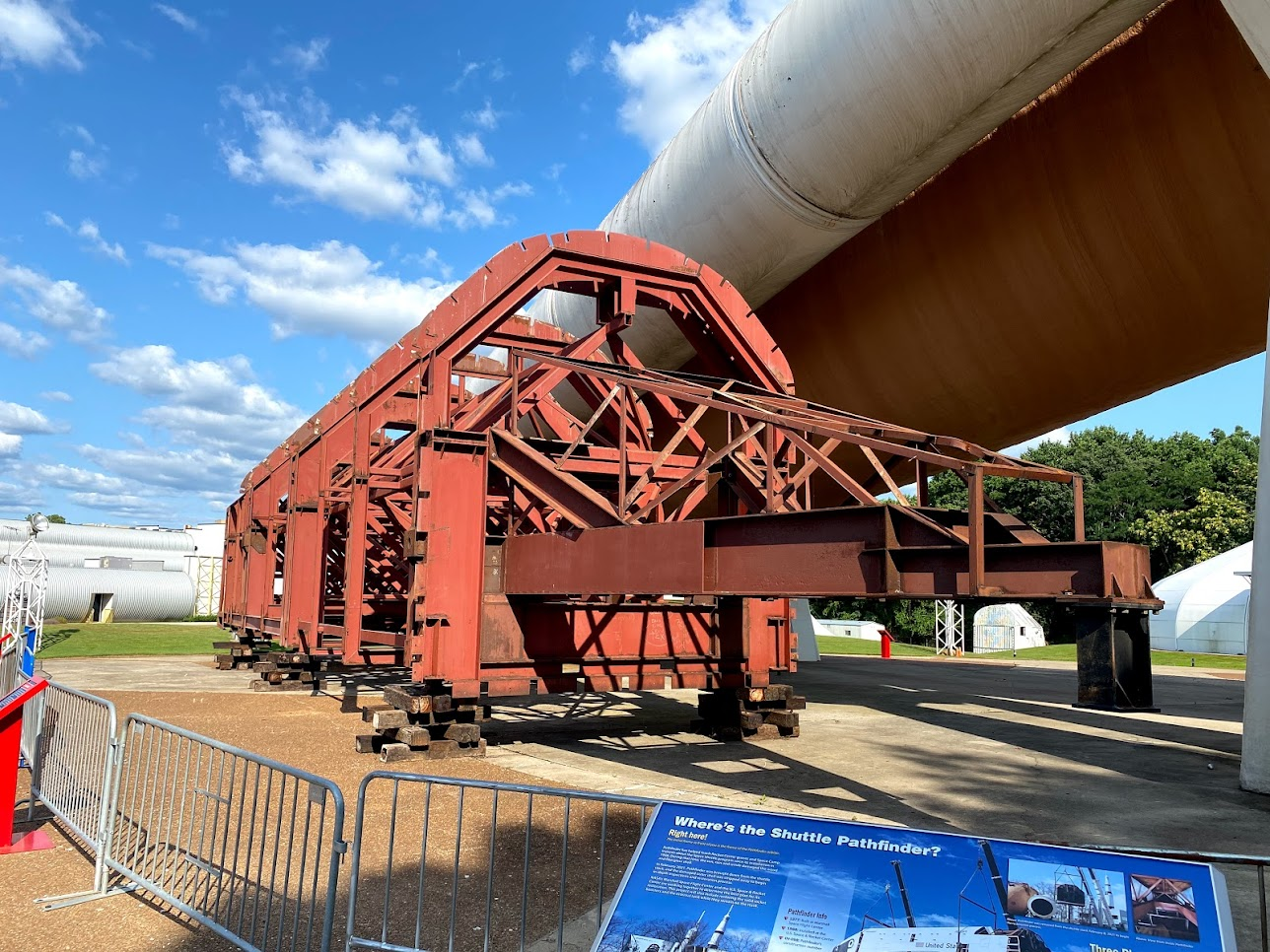
The Space Shuttle Pathfinder frame awaits restoration in 2021, beside its home for the preceding 30 years.

The restored Pathfinder in 2025

In 2020 the center received a "Save America's Treasures" grant for $500,000 from the National Park Service. The project began with the wings and tail section temporarily removed between January and February 2021. On February 8, the Pathfinder was lowered from its mounting points atop the fuel tank for the first time since May 5, 1988. The restoration project is proceeding alongside cooperation with the Marshall Space Flight Center, who will assist in assessing the structural integrity of the test shuttle.

On August 28, 2024, two cranes lifted the body of Pathfinder back into position on the shuttle stack in the first phase of a multi-day reassembly process. The reattachment of the wings and engine bells followed, completing the restoration of the display. The refurbishment also updated Pathfinder's markings from its pre-1982 markings to the 1998 markings with the NASA meatball logo.

== See also ==
- Space Shuttle Independence, a full-scale display mockup made according to shuttle blueprints
- Space Shuttle Inspiration, a pre-production engineering mockup
- For All Mankind; in Season 2 (set in an alternate 1983) there is a second-generation nuclear-powered shuttle named Pathfinder, with the orbiter designation OV-201
