= Space Shuttle external tank =

Component of the Space Shuttle launch vehicle

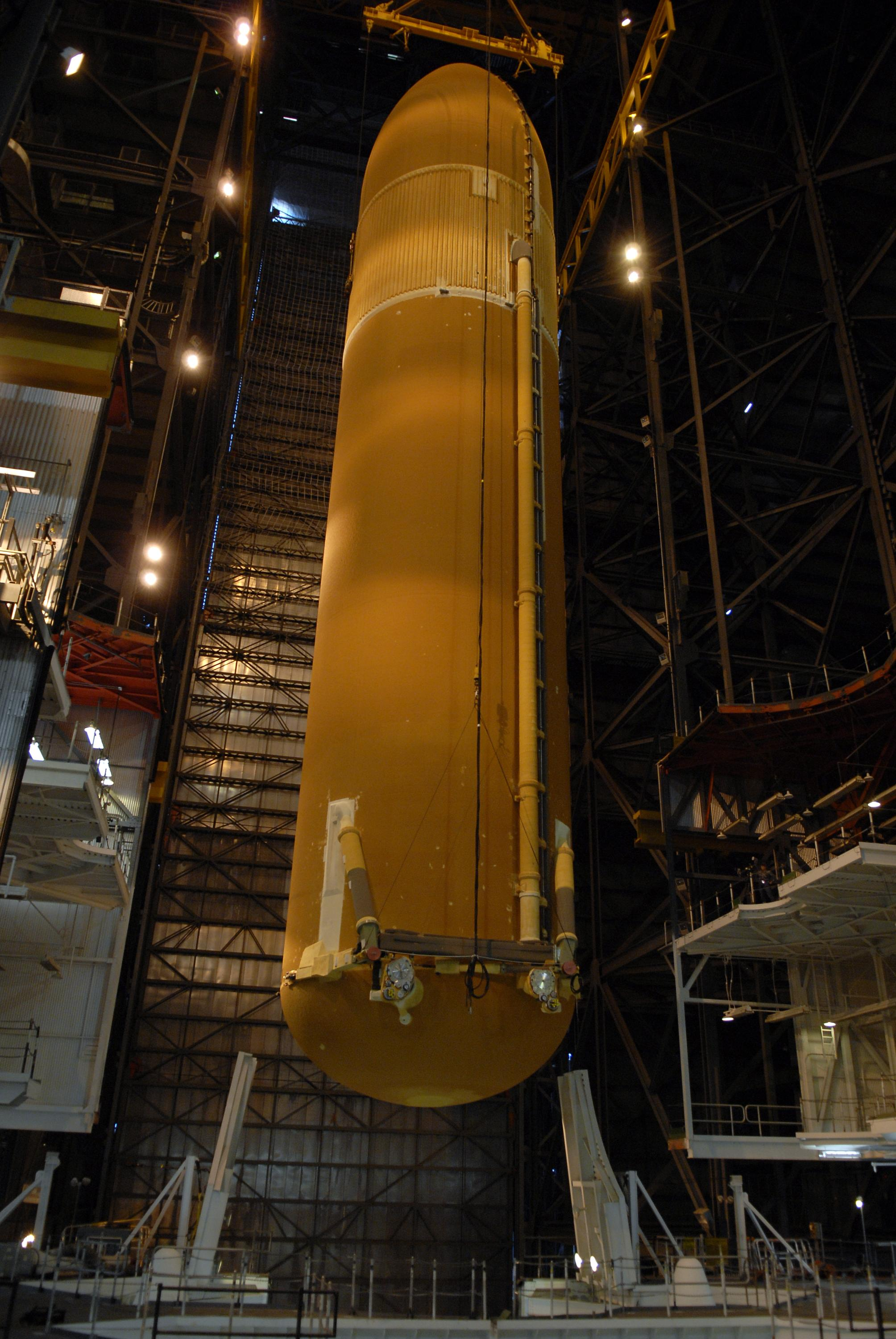
- External tank No. 124 is lowered into high bay 1 of the Vehicle Assembly Building prior to attachment of the solid rocket boosters for mission STS-117.
- Manufacturer: NASA Michoud Assembly Facility, contractor: Martin Marietta, later Lockheed Martin
- Country of origin: United States
- Used on: Space Shuttle

General characteristics
- Height: 46.9 m (153.8 ft)
- Diameter: 8.4 m (27.6 ft)
- Gross mass: 760,000 kg (1,680,000 lb)

Space Shuttle ET
- Powered by: 3 RS-25 mounted on the orbiter
- Maximum thrust: 1,254,000 lbf (5,580 kN)
- Burn time: 510 s
- Propellant: LH_{2}/LOX

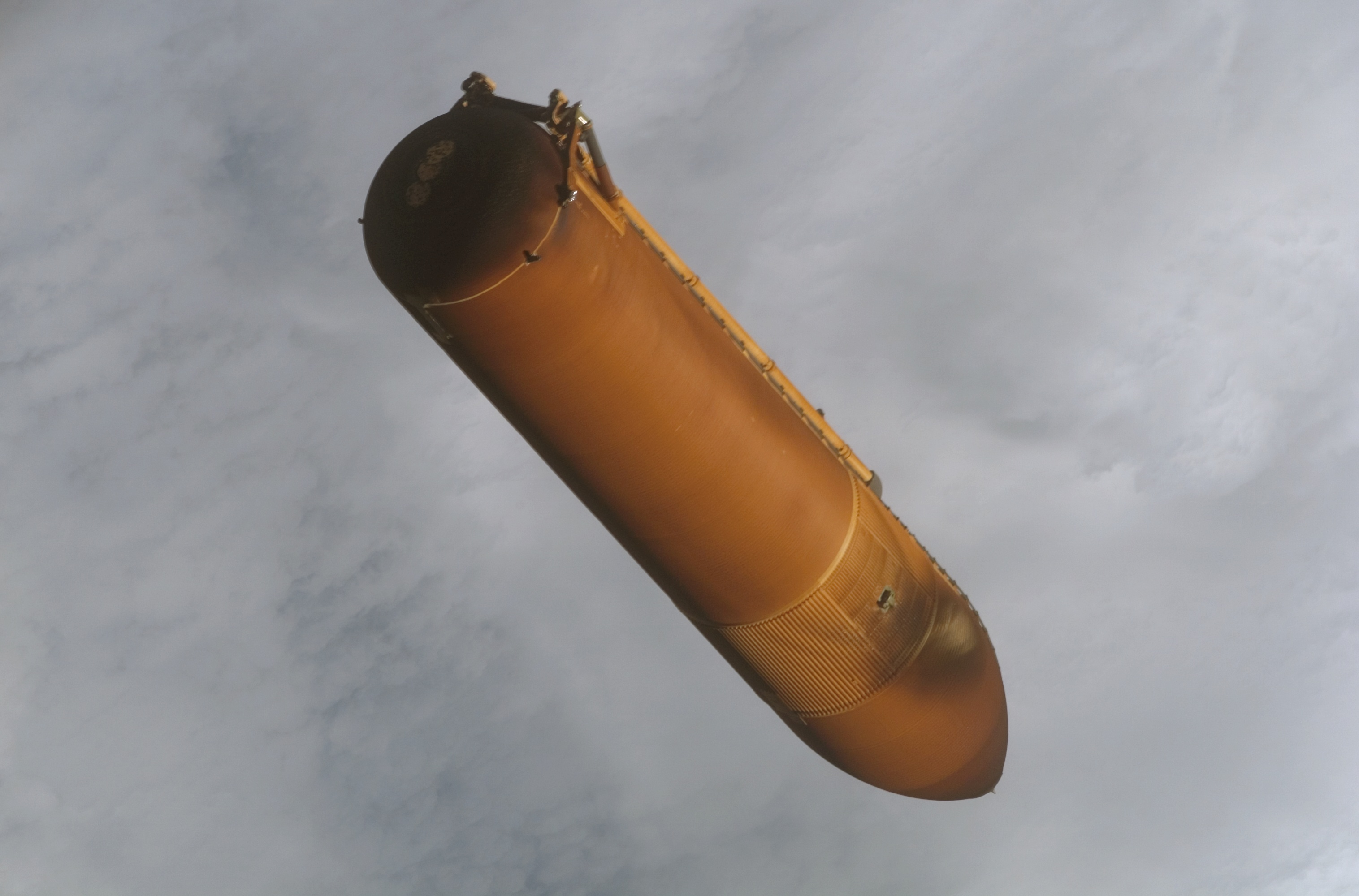
The ET from STS-115 after separation from the orbiter. The scorch mark near the front end of the tank is from the SRB separation motors.

The Space Shuttle external tank (ET) was the component of the Space Shuttle launch vehicle that contained the liquid hydrogen fuel and liquid oxygen oxidizer. During lift-off and ascent it supplied the fuel and oxidizer under pressure to the three RS-25 main engines in the orbiter. The ET was jettisoned just over 10 seconds after main engine cut-off (MECO) and it re-entered the Earth's atmosphere. Unlike the Solid Rocket Boosters, external tanks were not re-used. They broke up before impact in the Indian Ocean (or Pacific Ocean in the case of direct-insertion launch trajectories), away from shipping lanes and were not recovered.

== Overview ==
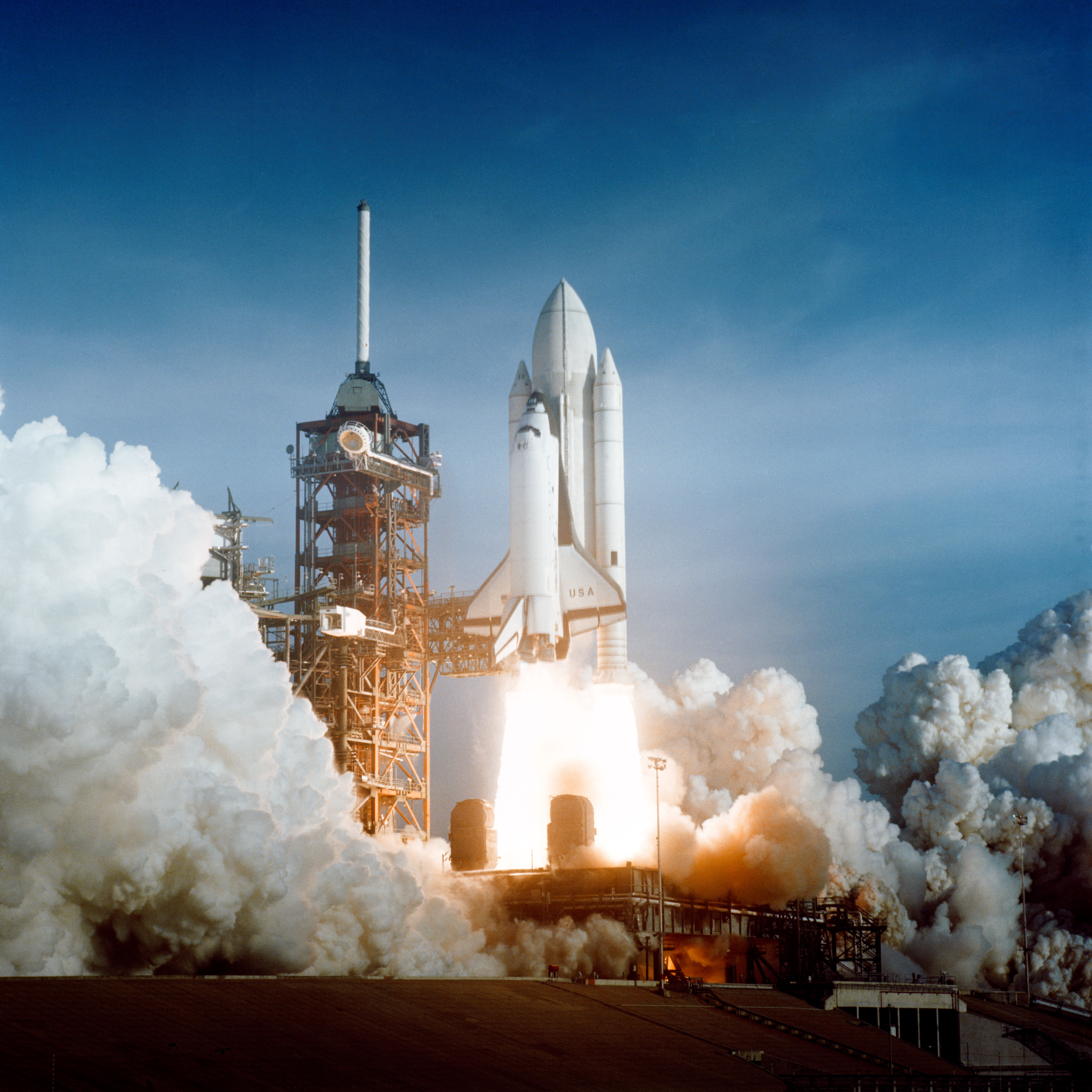
The external tank was painted white for the first two Space Shuttle launches.

From STS-3 on, it was left unpainted.

The ET was the largest element of the Space Shuttle, and when loaded, it was also the heaviest. It consisted of three major components:

- the forward liquid oxygen (LOX) tank
- an unpressurized intertank that contains most of the electrical components
- the aft liquid hydrogen (LH_{2}) tank; this was the largest part, but it was relatively light, due to liquid hydrogen's very low density.

The ET was the "backbone" of the shuttle during launch, providing structural support for attachment with the Space Shuttle Solid Rocket Boosters (SRBs) and orbiter. The tank was connected to each SRB at one forward attachment point (using a crossbeam through the intertank) and one aft bracket, and it was connected to the orbiter at one forward attachment bipod and two aft bipods. In the aft attachment area, there were also umbilicals that carried fluids, gases, electrical signals and electrical power between the tank and the orbiter. Electrical signals and controls between the orbiter and the two solid rocket boosters were also routed through those umbilicals.

Although the external tanks were always discarded, it may have been possible to re-use them in orbit. Plans for re-use ranged from incorporation into a space station as extra living or research space, as rocket fuel tanks for interplanetary missions (e.g. Mars), to raw materials for orbiting factories.

Another concept was to use the ET as a cargo carrier for bulky payloads. One proposal was for the primary mirror of a 7-meter aperture telescope to be carried with the tank. Another concept was the Aft Cargo Carrier (ACC).

== Versions ==
Over the years, NASA worked to reduce the weight of the ET to increase overall efficiency. The weight reduced from the ET resulted in an almost equal increase of the cargo-carrying capability of the Space Shuttle.

=== Orange color ===
The external tank's orange color is the color of the spray-on foam insulation. The first two tanks, used for STS-1 and STS-2, were painted white to protect the tanks from ultraviolet light during the extended time that the shuttle spent on the launch pad prior to launch. NASA engineer Farouk Huneidi told the agency that the paint did not actually protect the foam. Martin Marietta (now part of Lockheed Martin) reduced weight by leaving the rust-colored spray-on insulation unpainted beginning with STS-3, saving approximately 272 kg (600 lb).

=== Standard Weight Tank ===
The original ET is informally known as the Standard Weight Tank (SWT) and was fabricated from 2219 aluminum alloy, a high-strength aluminum-copper alloy used for many aerospace applications.

After STS-4, several hundred pounds were eliminated by deleting the anti-geyser line. This line paralleled the oxygen feed line, providing a circulation path for liquid oxygen. This reduces accumulation of gaseous oxygen in the feed line during prelaunch tanking (loading of the LOX). After propellant loading data from ground tests and the first few Space Shuttle missions were assessed, the anti-geyser line was removed for subsequent missions. The total length and diameter of the ET remain unchanged. The last SWT, flown on STS-7, weighed approximately 77,000 pounds (35,000 kg) inert.

=== Lightweight Tank ===
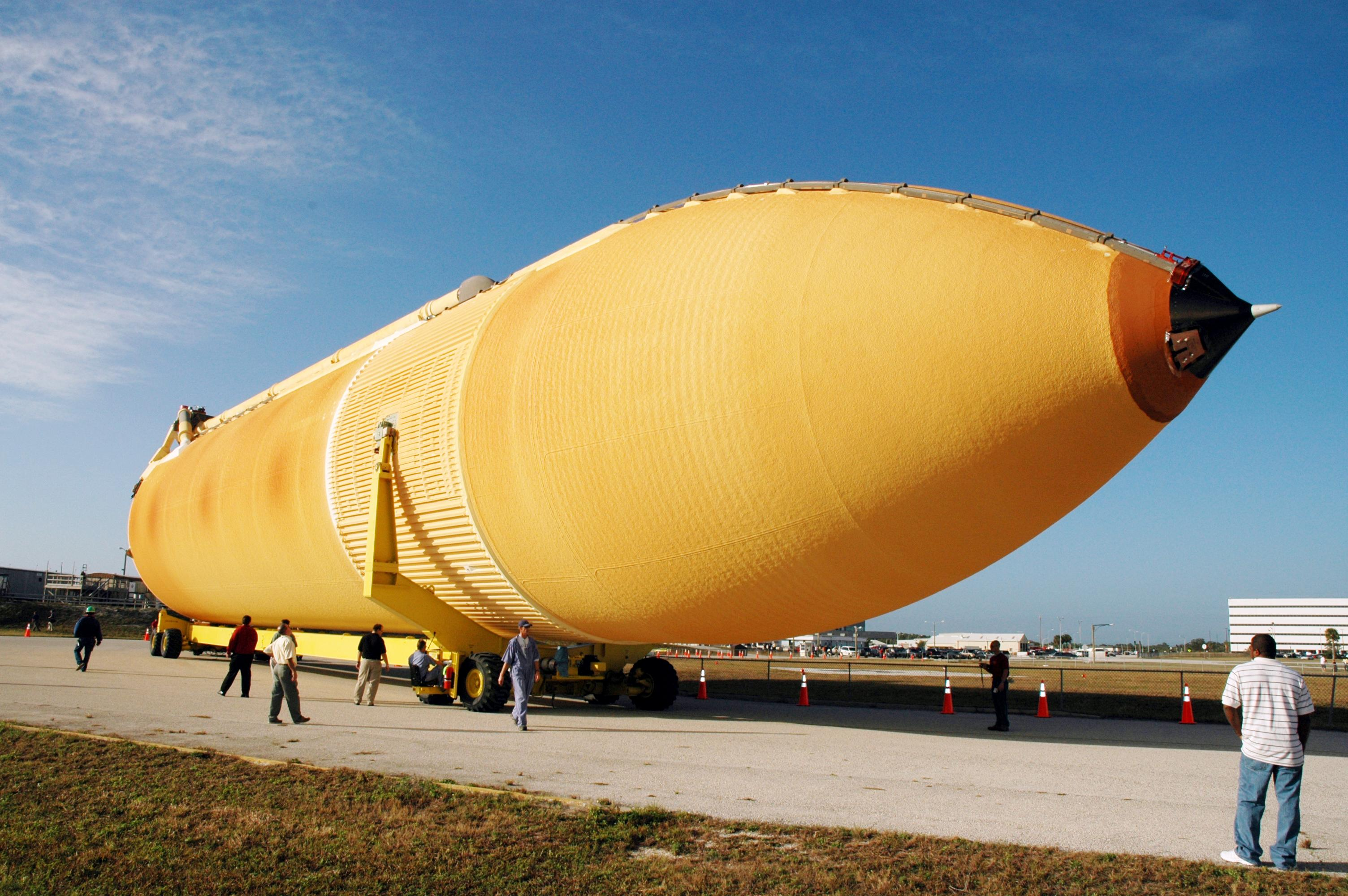
The Space Shuttle external tank for STS-114 on its way to the Vehicle Assembly Building

Beginning with the STS-6 mission, a lightweight ET (LWT), was introduced. This tank was used for the majority of the Shuttle flights, and was last used during the launch of the ill-fated STS-107 mission. Although tanks vary slightly in weight, each weighed approximately 66,000 pounds (30,000 kg) inert.

The weight reduction from the SWT was accomplished by eliminating portions of stringers (structural stiffeners running the length of the hydrogen tank), using fewer stiffener rings and by modifying major frames in the hydrogen tank. Also, significant portions of the tank were milled differently so as to reduce thickness, and the weight of the ET's aft solid rocket booster attachments was reduced by using a stronger, yet lighter and less expensive titanium alloy.

=== Super Lightweight Tank ===
The Super Lightweight Tank (SLWT) was first flown in 1998 on STS-91 and was used for all subsequent missions with two exceptions (STS-99 and STS-107). The SLWT had basically the same design as the LWT except that it used an aluminium-lithium alloy (Al 2195) for a large part of the tank structure. This alloy provided a significant reduction in tank weight (about 7,000 pounds or 3,175 kg) over the LWT. Manufacture also included friction stir welding technology. Although all ETs produced after the introduction of the SLWT were of this configuration, one LWT remained in inventory to be used if requested until the end of the shuttle era. The SLWT provided 50% of the performance increase required for the shuttle to reach the International Space Station. The reduction in weight allowed the Orbiter to carry more payload to the highly inclined orbit of the ISS.

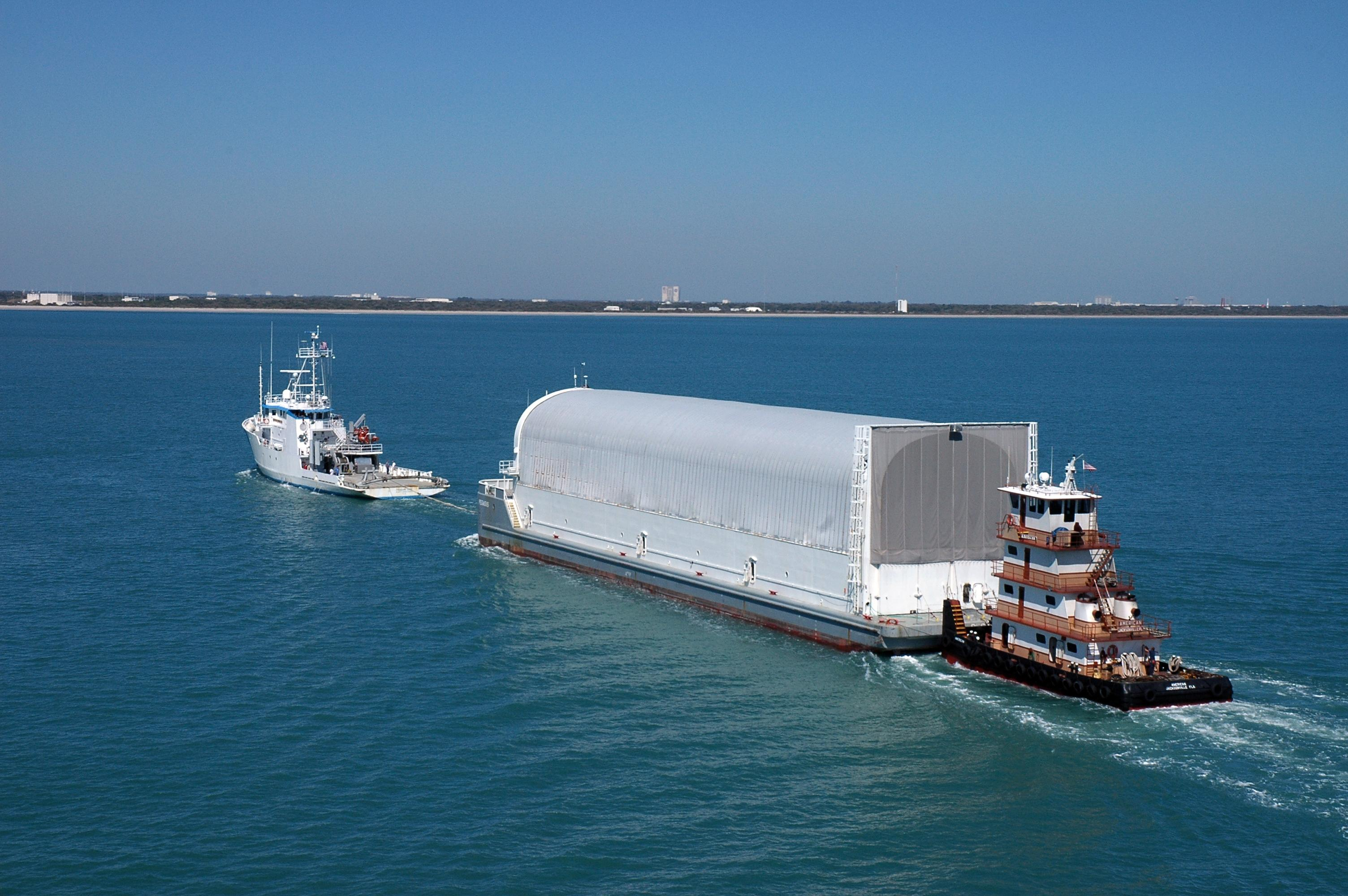
The Pegasus barge carrying ET-119 (which was used on STS-121) is towed to Port Canaveral.

=== Technical specifications ===
SLWT specifications

- Length: 153.8 ft (46.9 m)
- Diameter: 27.6 ft (8.4 m)
- Empty weight: 58,500 lb (26,500 kg)
- Gross liftoff weight: 1,680,000 lb (760,000 kg)

LOX tank

- Length: 54.6 ft (16.6 m)
- Diameter: 27.6 ft (8.4 m)
- Volume (at 22 psig): 19,541.66 cu ft (146,181.8 US gal; 553,358 L)
- LOX mass (at 22 psig): 1,387,457 lb (629,340 kg)
- Operation pressure: 34.7–36.7 psi (239–253 kPa) (absolute)

Intertank

- Length: 22.6 ft (6.9 m)
- Diameter: 27.6 ft (8.4 m)

LH_{2} tank

- Length: 97.0 ft (29.6 m)
- Diameter: 27.6 ft (8.4 m)
- Volume (at 29.3 psig): 52,881.61 cu ft (395,581.9 US gal; 1,497,440 L)
- LH_{2} mass (at 29.3 psig): 234,265 lb (106,261 kg)
- Operation pressure: 32–34 psi (220–230 kPa) (absolute)
- Operation temperature: −423 °F (−253 °C)

== Contractor ==
The contractor for the external tank was Lockheed Martin (previously Martin Marietta), New Orleans, Louisiana. The tank was manufactured at the Michoud Assembly Facility, New Orleans, and was transported to Kennedy Space Center by barge.

== Components ==
The ET has three primary structures: an LOX tank, an intertank, and an LH_{2} tank. Both tanks are constructed of aluminium alloy skins with support or stability frames as required. The intertank aluminium structure utilizes skin stringers with stabilizing frames. The primary aluminium materials used for all three structures are 2195 and 2090 alloys. AL 2195 is an Al-Li alloy designed by Lockheed Martin and Reynolds for storage of cryogenics (and used for the SLW version of the ET - earlier versions used Al 2219). Al 2090 is a commercially available Al-Li alloy.

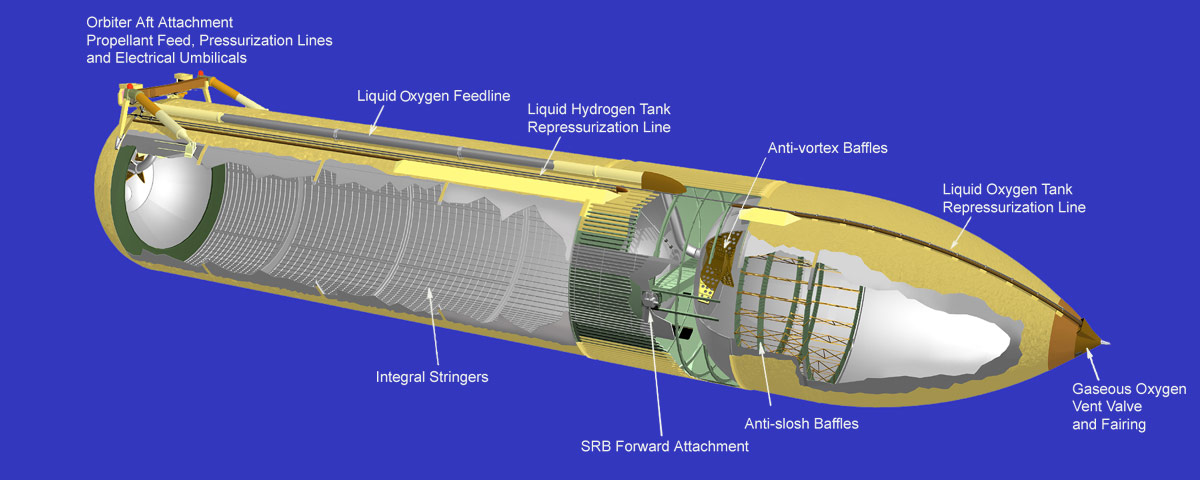
Anatomy of the external tank

=== Liquid oxygen tank ===
The LOX tank is located at the top (Note: Officially, these are referred to as "forward/aft" as the positions on the shuttle are referred to with respect to the orbiter in horizontal/gliding flight, but when mounted vertically on the launch platform it is seen as the "top/bottom.") of the ET and has an ogive shape to reduce aerodynamic drag and aerothermodynamic heating. The ogive nose section is capped by a flat removable cover plate and a nose cone. The nose cone consists of a removable conical assembly that serves as an aerodynamic fairing for the propulsion and electrical system components. The foremost element of the nose cone functions as a cast aluminium lightning rod. The LOX tank volume is 19,744 cu ft (559.1 m^{3}) at 22 psi (150 kPa) and −297 °F (90.4 K; −182.8 °C) (cryogenic).

The tank feeds into a 17 in (430 mm) diameter feed line that conveys the liquid oxygen through the intertank, then outside the ET to the aft right-hand ET/orbiter disconnect umbilical. The 17 in (430 mm) diameter feed line permits liquid oxygen to flow at approximately 2,787 lb/s (75,800 kg/min) with the RS-25s operating at 104% or permits a maximum flow of 17,592 US gal/min (1.1099 m^{3}/s).

All loads except aerodynamic loads are transferred from the LOX tank at a bolted, flange-joint interface with the intertank.

The LOX tank also includes an internal slosh baffle and a vortex baffle to dampen fluid slosh. The vortex baffle is mounted over the LOX feed outlet to reduce fluid swirl resulting from slosh and to prevent entrapment of gases in the delivered LOX.

=== Intertank ===
The intertank is the ET structural connection between the LOX and LH_{2} tanks. Its primary functions are to receive and distribute all thrust loads from the SRBs and transfer loads between the tanks.

The two SRB forward attach fittings are located 180° apart on the intertank structure. A beam is extended across the intertank structure and is mechanically fastened to the attach fittings. When the SRBs are firing, the beam will flex due to high stress loads. These loads will be transferred to the fittings.

Adjoining the SRB attach fittings is a major ring frame. The loads are transferred from the fittings to the major ring frame which then distributes the tangential loads to the intertank skin. Two panels of the intertank skin, called the thrust panels, distribute the concentrated axial SRB thrust loads to the LOX and LH_{2} tanks and to adjacent intertank skin panels. These adjacent panels are made up of six stringer-stiffened panels.

The intertank also functions as a protective compartment for housing the operational instrumentation.

=== Liquid hydrogen tank ===
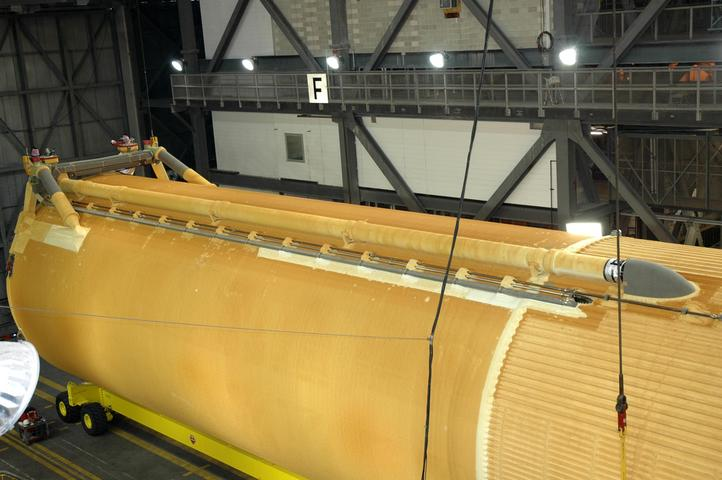
The 70-foot-long (21 m), 17-inch-diameter (430 mm) liquid oxygen feedline runs externally along the right side of the liquid hydrogen tank up and into the intertank. Two 5-inch (130 mm) diameter re-pressurization lines run beside it. One supplies hydrogen gas to the liquid hydrogen tank and the other supplies oxygen gas to the liquid oxygen tank. They are used to maintain the ullage pressure in each tank during the launch.

The LH_{2} tank is the bottom portion of the ET. The tank is constructed of four cylindrical barrel sections, a forward dome, and an aft dome. The barrel sections are joined by five major ring frames. These ring frames receive and distribute loads. The forward dome-to-barrel frame distributes the loads applied through the intertank structure and is also the flange for attaching the LH_{2} tank to the intertank. The aft major ring receives orbiter-induced loads from the aft orbiter support struts and SRB-induced loads from the aft SRB support struts. The remaining three ring frames distribute orbiter thrust loads and LOX feedline support loads. Loads from the frames are then distributed through the barrel skin panels. The LH_{2} tank has a volume of 53,488 cubic feet (1,514.6 m^{3}) at 29.3 psi (202 kPa) and −423 °F (−252.8 °C) (cryogenic).

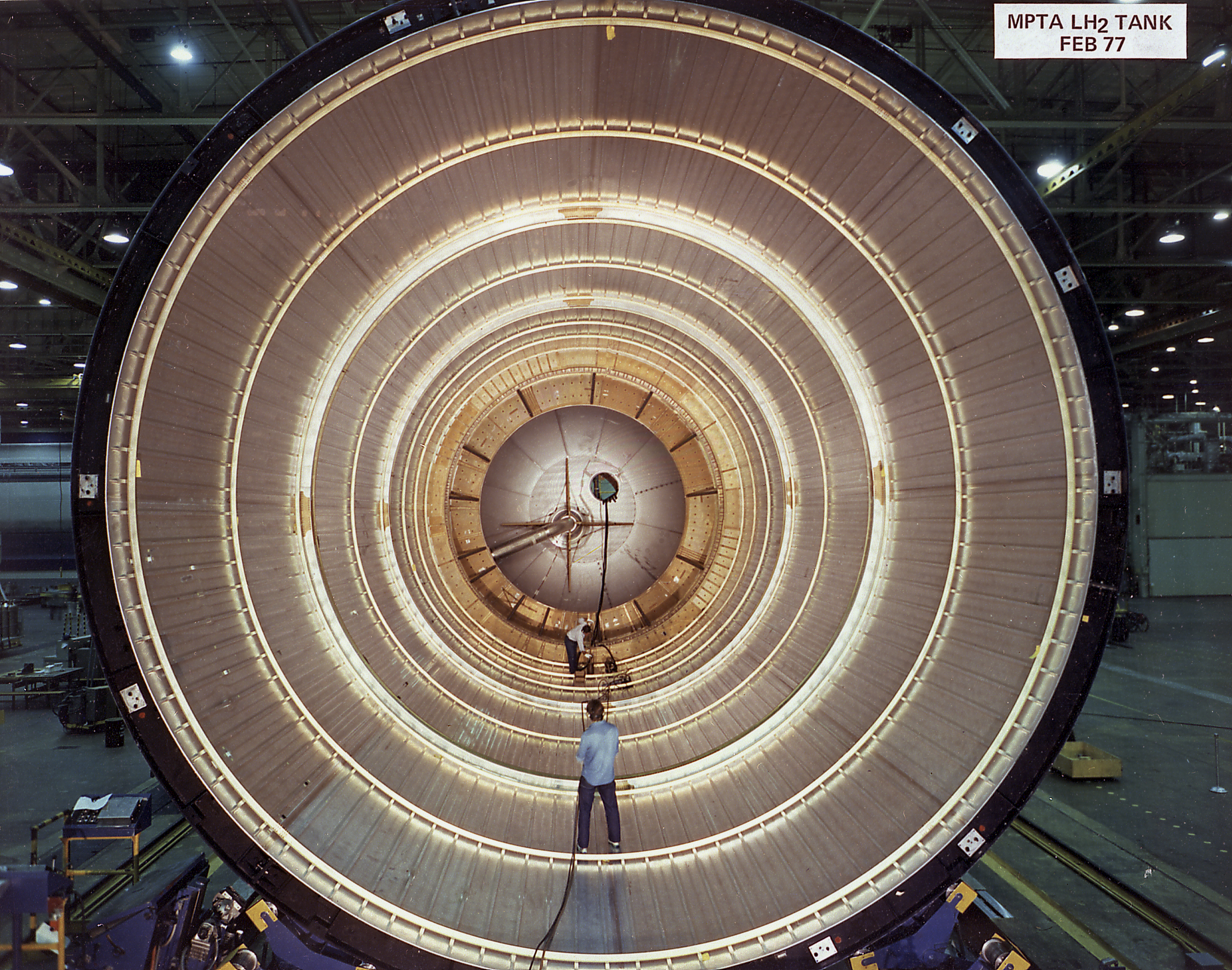
Interior of a liquid hydrogen tank during assembly at the NASA rocket factory, with humans for scale

The forward and aft domes have the same modified ellipsoidal shape. For the forward dome, mounting provisions are incorporated for the LH_{2} vent valve, the LH_{2} pressurization line fitting, and the electrical feed-through fitting. The aft dome has a manhole fitting for access to the LH_{2} feedline screen and a support fitting for the LH_{2} feedline.

The LH_{2} tank also has a vortex baffle to reduce swirl resulting from slosh and to prevent entrapment of gases in the delivered LH_{2}. The baffle is located at the siphon outlet just above the aft dome of the LH_{2} tank. This outlet transmits the liquid hydrogen from the tank through a 17 inches (430 mm) line to the left aft umbilical. The liquid hydrogen feed line flow rate is 465 lb/s (12,700 kg/min) with the main engines at 104% or a maximum flow of 47,365 US gal/min (2.9883 m^{3}/s).

=== Thermal protection system ===
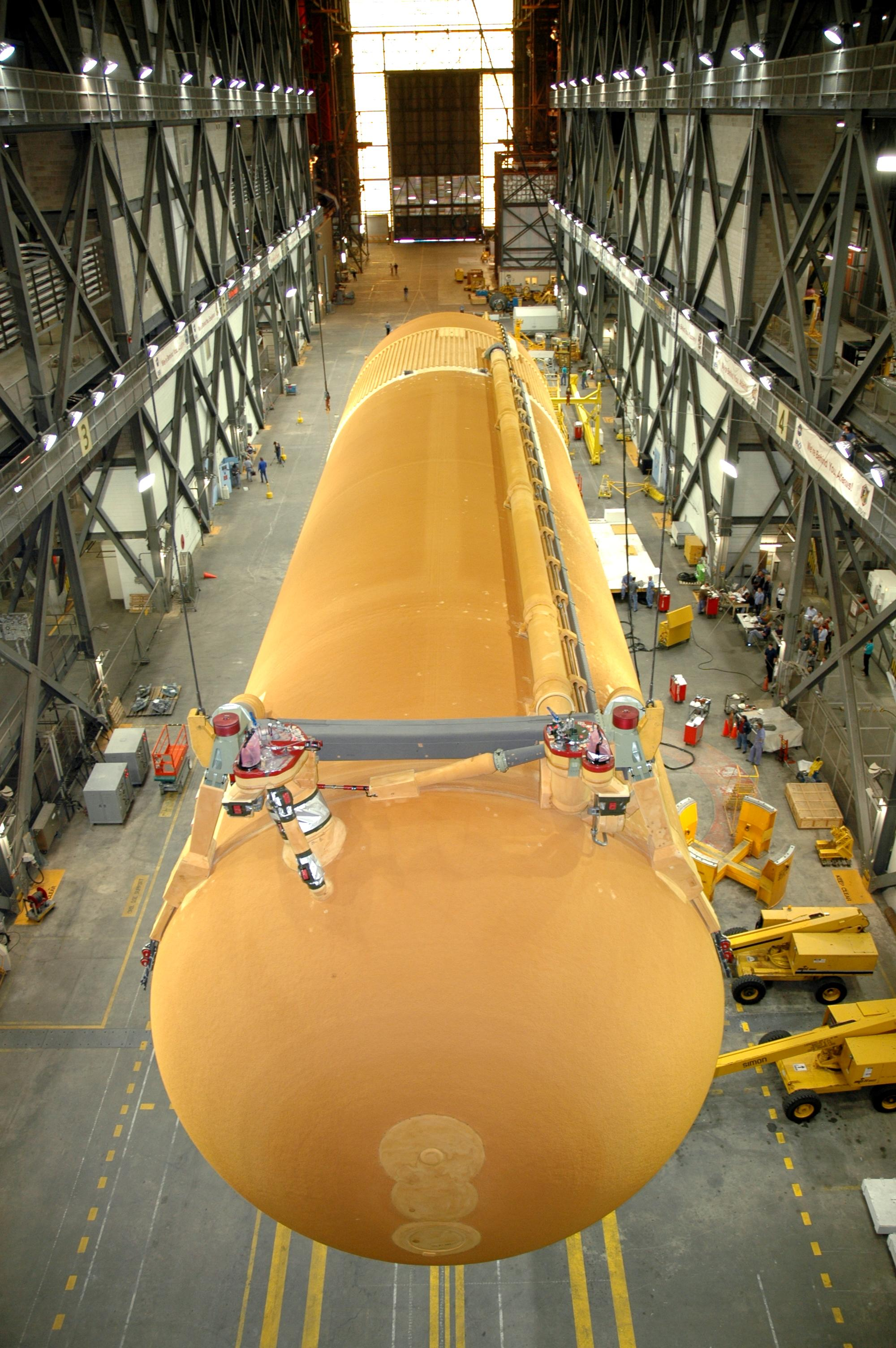
The Orbiter attachment hardware, liquid hydrogen umbilical connection (left), and liquid oxygen umbilical connection (right) are visible at the bottom of the tank.

The ET thermal protection system consists primarily of spray-on foam insulation (SOFI), plus preformed foam pieces and premolded ablator materials. The system also includes the use of phenolic thermal insulators to preclude air liquefaction. Thermal isolators are required for liquid hydrogen tank attachments to preclude the liquefaction of air on exposed metal, and to reduce heat flow into the liquid hydrogen. While the warmer liquid oxygen results in fewer thermal requirements, the aluminum of the liquid oxygen tank forward areas require protection from aeroheating. Meanwhile, insulation on the aft surfaces prevents liquified air from pooling in the intertank. The middle cylinder of the oxygen tank, and the propellant lines, could withstand the expected depths of frost accumulation condensed from humidity, but the orbiter could not take the damage from ice breaking free. The thermal protection system weighs 4,823 lb (2,188 kg).

Development of the ETs thermal protection system was problematic. Anomalies in foam application were so frequent that they were treated as variances, not safety incidents. NASA had difficulty preventing fragments of foam from detaching during flight for the entire history of the program:

- STS-1 Columbia, 1981: Crew reports white material streaming past windows during orbiter-external-tank flight. Crew estimated sizes from 1/4 inch (6 mm) to fist-sized. Post-landing report describes probable foam loss of unknown location, and 300 tiles needing outright replacement due to various causes.
- STS-4 Columbia, 1982: PAL ramp loss; 40 tiles require outright replacement.
- STS-5 Columbia, 1982: Continued high rate of tile loss.
- STS-7 Challenger, 1983: 50 by 30 cm (20 by 12 in) Bipod ramp loss photographed, dozens of spot losses.
- STS-27 Atlantis, 1988: One large loss of uncertain origin, causing one total tile loss. Hundreds of small losses.
- STS-32 Columbia, 1990: Bipod ramp loss photographed; five spot losses up to 70 cm in diameter, plus tile damages.
- STS-50 Columbia, 1992: Bipod ramp loss. 20×10×1 cm tile damage.
- STS-52 Columbia, 1992: Portion of bipod ramp, jackpad lost. 290 total tile marks, 16 greater than an inch.
- STS-62 Columbia, 1994: Portion of bipod ramp lost.

In 1995, chlorofluorocarbon-11 (CFC-11) began to be withdrawn from large-area, machine-sprayed foams in compliance with an Environmental Protection Agency ban on CFCs under section 610 of the Clean Air Act. In its place, a hydrochlorofluorocarbon known as HCFC-141b was certified for use and phased into the shuttle program. Remaining foams, particularly detail pieces sprayed by hand, continued to use CFC-11 through the end of the program. These areas include the problematic bipod and PAL ramps, as well as some fittings and interfaces. For the bipod ramp in particular, "the process of applying foam to that part of the tank had not changed since 1993." The "new" foam containing HCFC 141b was first used on the aft dome portion of ET-82 during the flight of STS-79 in 1996. Use of HCFC 141b was expanded to the ETs area, or larger portions of the tank, starting with ET-88, which flew on STS-86 in 1997.

During the lift-off of STS-107 on January 16, 2003, a piece of foam insulation detached from one of the tank's bipod ramps and struck the leading edge of Space Shuttle Columbia's wing at a few hundred miles per hour. The impact is believed to have damaged one comparatively large reinforced carbon-carbon panel on the leading edge of the left wing, believed to be about the size of a basketball which then allowed super-heated gas to enter the wing superstructure several days later during re-entry. This resulted in the destruction of Columbia and the loss of its crew. The report determined that the external fuel tank, ET-93, "had been constructed with BX-250", a closeout foam whose blowing agent was CFC-11 and not the newer HCFC 141b.

In 2005, the problem of foam shed had not been fully cured; on STS-114, additional cameras mounted on the tank recorded a piece of foam separated from one of its Protuberance Air Load (PAL) ramps, which are designed to prevent unsteady air flow underneath the tank's cable trays and pressurization lines during ascent. The PAL ramps consist of manually sprayed layers of foam, and are more likely to become a source of debris. That piece of foam did not impact the orbiter.

Reports published concurrent with the STS-114 mission suggest that excessive handling of the ET during modification and upgrade may have contributed to the foam loss on Discovery's Return to Flight mission. However, three shuttle missions (STS-121, STS-115, and STS-116) were later conducted, all with "acceptable" levels of foam loss. However, on STS-118 a piece of foam (and/or ice) about 3.9 in (100 mm) in diameter separated from a feedline attachment bracket on the tank, ricocheted off one of the aft struts and struck the underside of the wing, damaging two tiles. The damage was not considered dangerous.

=== Hardware ===
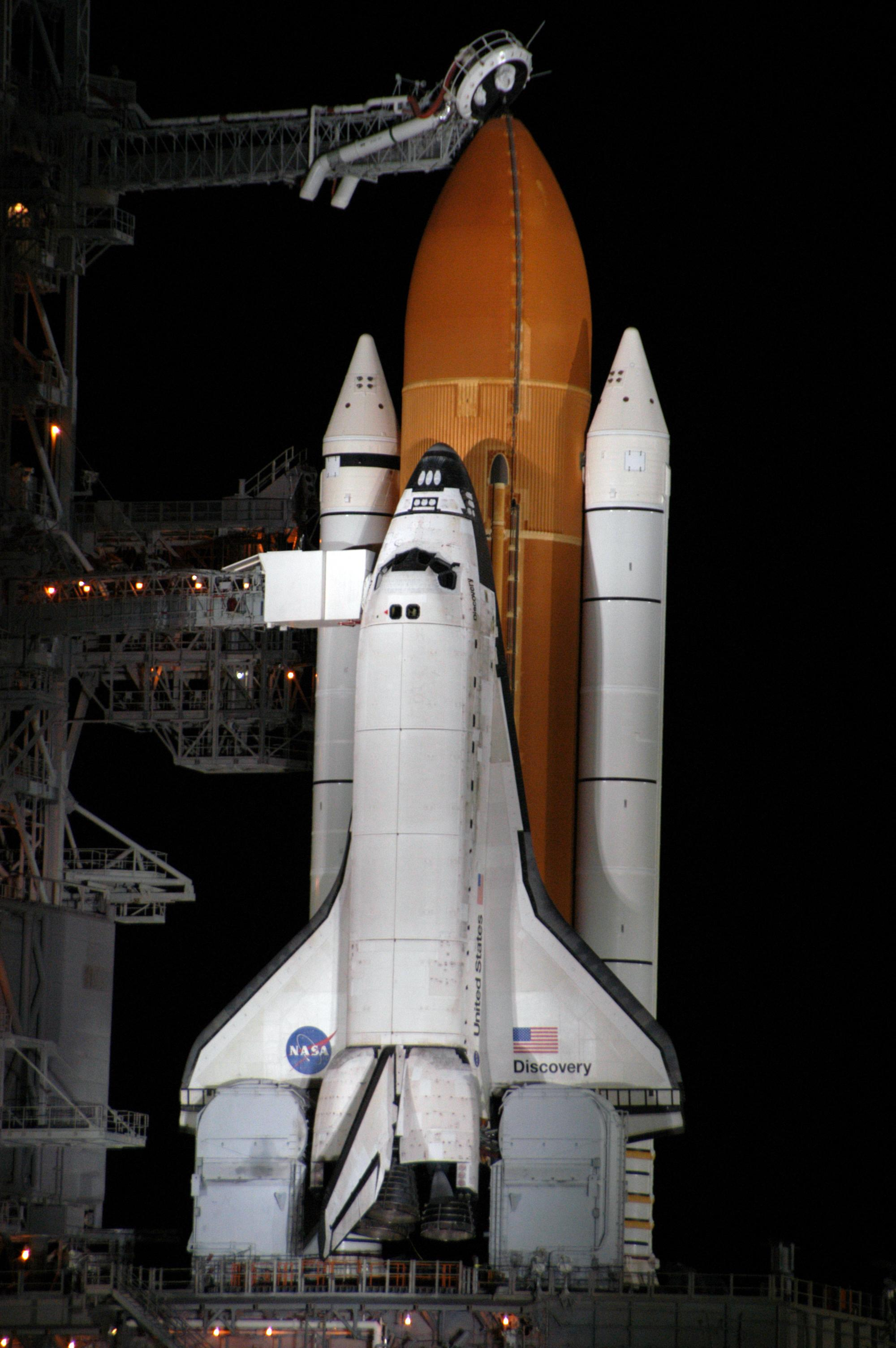
Space Shuttle Discovery before the launch of STS-116 in December 2006. Beneath Discovery's wings are the tail masts, which provide several umbilical connections to the orbiter, including a liquid-oxygen line through one and a liquid-hydrogen line through another. Seen above the golden external tank is the vent hood (known as the "beanie cap") at the end of the gaseous oxygen vent arm, extending from the fixed service structure. Vapor boils off the liquid oxygen in the external tank. The hood vents the oxygen vapor away from the Space Shuttle vehicle.

The external hardware, ET–orbiter attachment fittings, umbilical fittings, and electrical and range safety system weigh 9,100 pounds (4,100 kg).

==== Vents and relief valves ====
Each propellant tank has a vent and relief valve at its forward end. This dual-function valve can be opened by ground support equipment for the vent function during prelaunch and can open during flight when the ullage (empty space) pressure of the liquid hydrogen tank reaches 38 psi (260 kPa) or the ullage pressure of the liquid oxygen tank reaches 25 psi (170 kPa).

On early flights, the liquid oxygen tank contained a separate, pyrotechnically operated, propulsive tumble vent valve at its forward end. At separation, the liquid oxygen tumble vent valve was opened, providing impulse to assist in the separation maneuver and more positive control of the entry aerodynamics of the ET. The last flight with the tumble valve active was STS-36.

Each of the two aft external tank umbilical plates mate with a corresponding plate on the orbiter. The plates help maintain alignment among the umbilicals. Physical strength at the umbilical plates is provided by bolting corresponding umbilical plates together. When the orbiter GPCs command external tank separation, the bolts are severed by pyrotechnic devices.

The ET has five propellant umbilical valves that interface with orbiter umbilicals: two for the liquid oxygen tank and three for the liquid hydrogen tank. One of the liquid oxygen tank umbilical valves is for liquid oxygen, the other for gaseous oxygen. The liquid hydrogen tank umbilical has two valves for liquid and one for gas. The intermediate-diameter liquid hydrogen umbilical is a recirculation umbilical used only during the liquid hydrogen chill-down sequence during prelaunch.

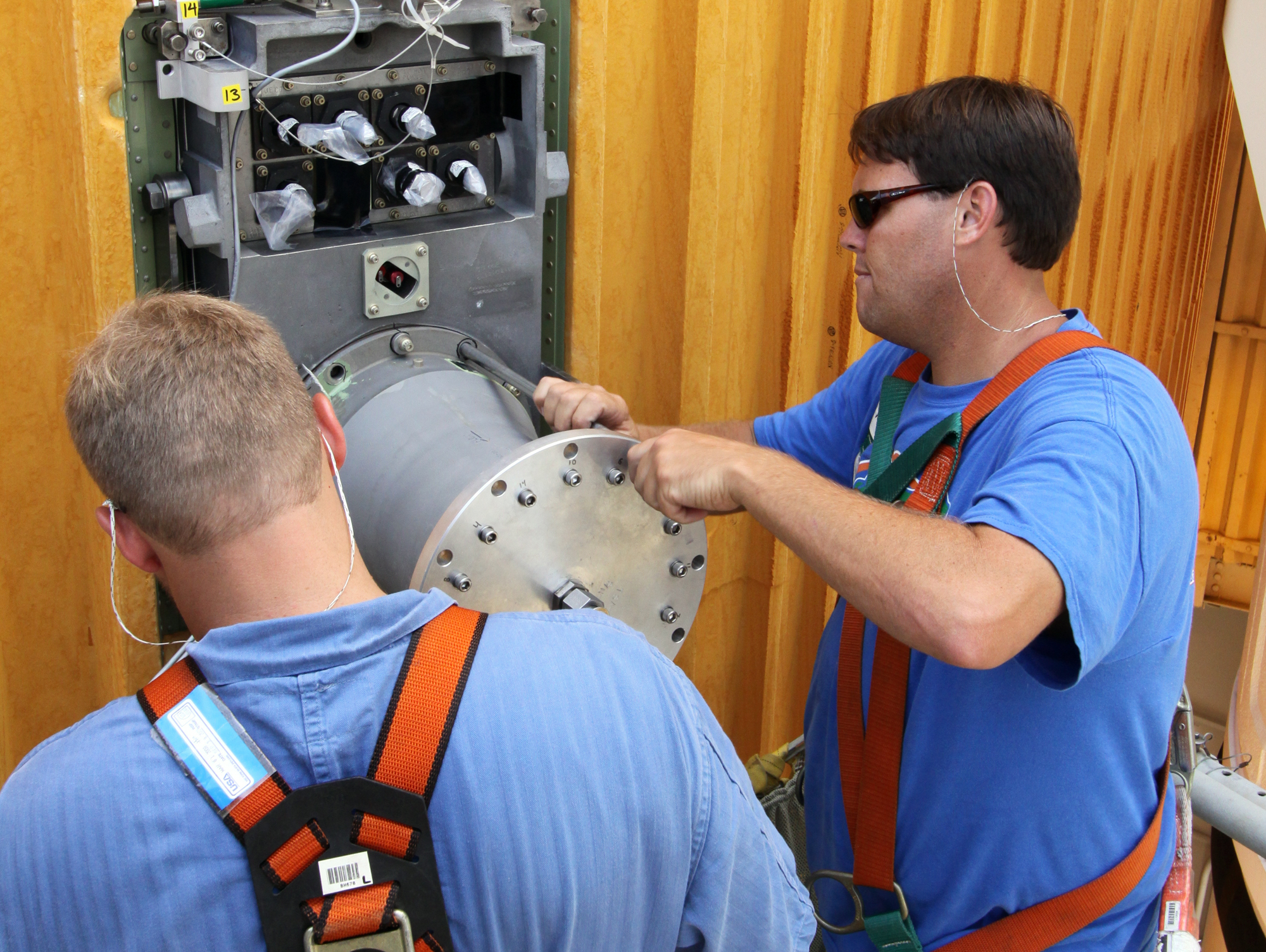
Technicians inspect the GUCP following a scrub of STS-127 due to elevated hydrogen levels at this connector.

As the ET is filled, excess gaseous hydrogen is vented through umbilical connections over a large diameter pipe on an arm extended from the fixed service structure. The connection for this pipe between the ET and service structure is made at the ground umbilical carrier plate (GUCP). Sensors are also installed at the GUCP to measure hydrogen levels. Countdowns of STS-80, STS-119, STS-127 and STS-133 have been halted and resulted in several week delays in the later cases due to hydrogen leaks at this connection. This requires complete draining of the tanks and removal of all hydrogen via helium gas purge, a 20-hour process, before technicians can inspect and repair problems.

A cap mounted to the swing-arm on the fixed service structure covers the oxygen tank vent on top of the ET during the countdown and is retracted about two minutes before lift-off. The cap siphons off oxygen vapor that threatens to form large ice accumulations on the ET, thus protecting the orbiter's thermal protection system during launch.

==== Sensors ====
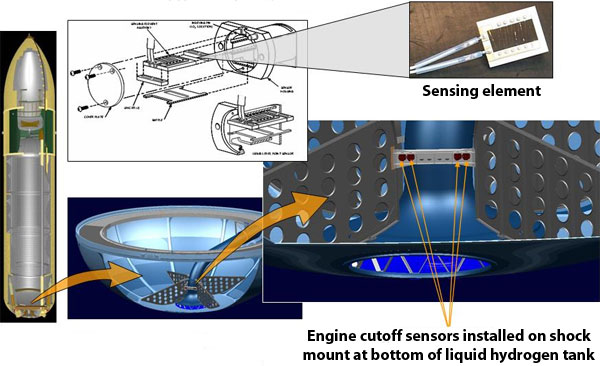
The location of ECO sensors in the LH_{2} tank

There are eight propellant-depletion sensors, four each for fuel and oxidizer. The fuel-depletion sensors are located in the bottom of the fuel tank. The oxidizer sensors are mounted in the orbiter liquid oxygen feed line manifold downstream of the feed line disconnect. During RS-25 thrusting, the orbiter general-purpose computers constantly compute the instantaneous mass of the vehicle due to the usage of the propellants. Normally, main engine cutoff is based on a predetermined velocity; however, if any two of the fuel or oxidizer sensors sense a dry condition, the engines will be shut down.

The locations of the liquid oxygen sensors allow the maximum amount of oxidizer to be consumed in the engines, while allowing sufficient time to shut down the engines before the oxidizer pumps cavitate (run dry). In addition, 1,100 lb (500 kg) of liquid hydrogen are loaded over and above that required by the 6:1 oxidizer–fuel engine mixture ratio. This assures that cutoff from the depletion sensors is fuel-rich; oxidizer-rich engine shutdowns can cause burning and severe erosion of engine components, potentially leading to loss of the vehicle and crew.

Unexplained, erroneous readings from fuel depletion sensors have delayed several shuttle launch attempts, most notably STS-122. On December 18, 2007, a tanking test determined the cause of the errors to be a fault in a wiring connector, rather than a failure of the sensors themselves.

Four pressure transducers located at the top of the liquid oxygen and liquid hydrogen tanks monitor the ullage pressures.

The ET also has two electrical umbilicals that carry electrical power from the orbiter to the tank and the two SRBs and provide information from the SRBs and ET to the orbiter.

The ET has external cameras mounted in the brackets attached to the shuttle along with transmitters that can continue to send video data long after the shuttle and the ET have separated.

=== Range safety system ===
Earlier tanks incorporated a range safety system to disperse tank propellants if necessary. It included a battery power source, a receiver/decoder, antennas and ordnance. Starting with STS-79 this system was disabled, and was completely removed for STS-88 and all subsequent flights.

== Future use ==
In 1990, it was suggested that the external tank would be used as a lunar habitat or as an orbital station. These proposals did not come to fruition.

=== As basis for Ares in Constellation ===
With the retirement of the Space Shuttle in 2011, NASA, with its canceled Constellation program, which featured the Orion spacecraft, would also have featured the debut of two Shuttle-derived launch vehicles, the human-rated Ares I crew-launch vehicle and the heavy-lift Ares V cargo-launch vehicle.

While both the Ares I and Ares V would have utilized a modified five-segment Solid Rocket Booster for its first stage, the ET would have served as a baseline technology for the first stage of the Ares V and the second stage of the Ares I; as a comparison, the Ares I second stage would have held approximately 26,000 US gal (98,000 L) of LOX, versus the ET holding 146,000 US gal (550,000 L), more than 5 times that amount.

The Ares V first stage, which would have been fitted with five RS-68 rocket engines (the same engine used on the Delta IV rocket), would be 33 feet (10 m) in diameter, as wide as the S-IC and S-II stages on the Saturn V rocket. It would have utilized the same internal ET configuration (separate LH_{2} and LOX tanks separated with an intertank structure), but would have been configured to directly accept LH_{2} and LOX fill and drain, along with LOX venting on a retractable arm like that used on the Shuttle for LH_{2}.

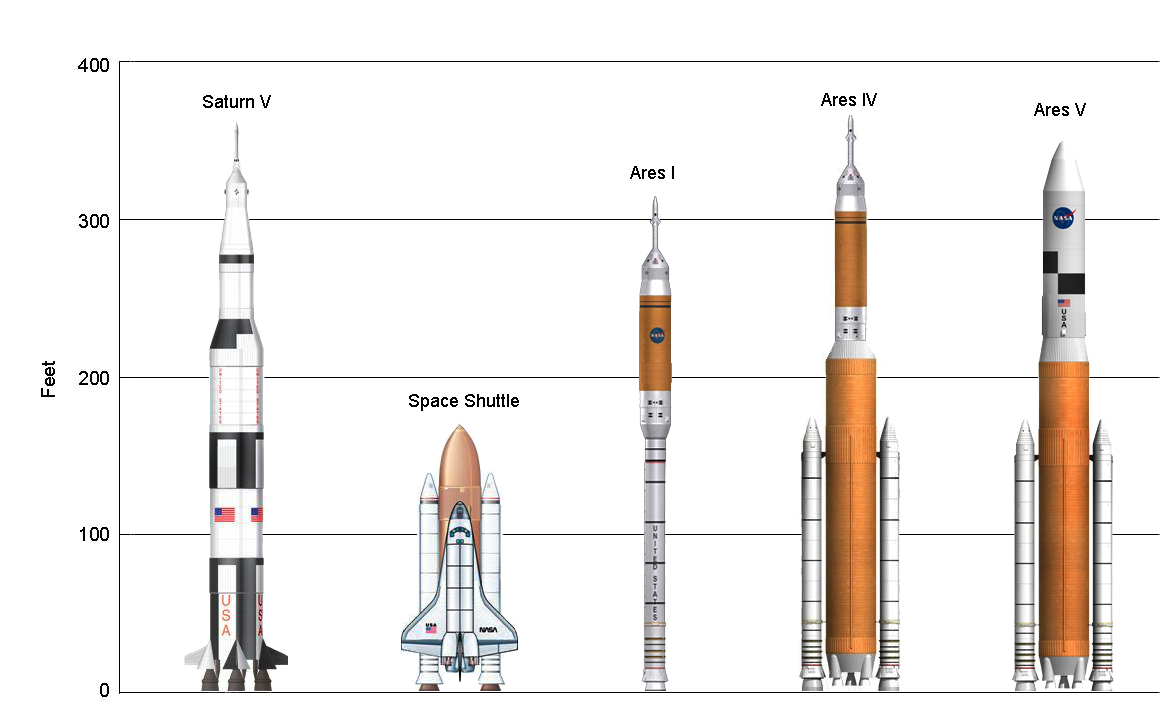
Comparison of the Saturn V, Space Shuttle, Ares I, Ares IV and Ares V

The Ares I second stage, on the other hand, would have only used the spray-on insulation foam from the ET. Originally configured like that of the Ares V and the Shuttle ET, NASA, upon completing its design review in 2006, decided to reconfigure the internal structure of the second stage by using a combined LH_{2}/LOX tank with the propellants separated by a common bulkhead. This was a configuration previously used successfully on the S-II and S-IVB stages of the Saturn V rocket, and was done in order to save weight and costs. Unlike the Ares V, which would have used the same fill/drain/vent configuration used on the Shuttle, the Ares I system would have utilized a traditional fill/drain/vent system used on the Saturn IB and Saturn V rockets, but with quick-retracting arms due to the "leap frog" speed the Ares I would expect upon SRB ignition.

As originally envisioned, both the Ares I and Ares V would have used a modified "throw away" version of the RS-25 engine, but in due course, because of the need to keep R&D costs down and to maintain a schedule set by NASA Administration Michael D. Griffin to launch the Ares and Orion by 2011, NASA decided (after the 2006 review) to switch to the cheaper RS-68 engine for the Ares V and to an uprated J-2 engine for the Ares I. Because of the switch to the less efficient RS-68, the Ares V was widened from 28.6 to 33 feet (8.72 to 10.06 m) to accommodate the additional propellant required, while the Ares I was reconfigured to incorporate a fifth solid-rocket segment with the J-2X upper stage, as the new engine has less thrust than the original RS-25. Because of the trade-off, NASA would save an estimated US$35 million by using simplified, higher thrust RS-68 engines (reconfigured to fire and perform like the SSME), while at the same time, eliminate the costly tests needed for an air-startable RS-25 for the Ares I.

=== Proposed for DIRECT ===
The DIRECT project, a proposed alternative shuttle-derived vehicle, would have used a modified, standard diameter, external tank with three RS-25 engines, with two standard SRBM, as a Crew Launch Vehicle. The same vehicle, with one extra RS-25, and an EDS upper stage, would have served as the Cargo Launch Vehicle. It was planned to save $16 billion, eliminate NASA job losses, and reduce the post-shuttle, crewed spaceflight gap from five plus years to two or less.

=== Core stage of Space Launch System ===
The Space Launch System (SLS) is a US super heavy-lift expendable launch vehicle, which first flew on Artemis 1 in November 2022.

The core stage of the rocket is 8.4 meters (28 ft) in diameter and mount a Main Propulsion System (MPS) incorporating four RS-25 engines. The core stage is structurally similar to the Space Shuttle external tank, and initial flights will use modified RS-25D engines left over from the Space Shuttle program. Later flights will switch to a cheaper version of the engine not intended for reuse.

=== Un-flown hardware ===
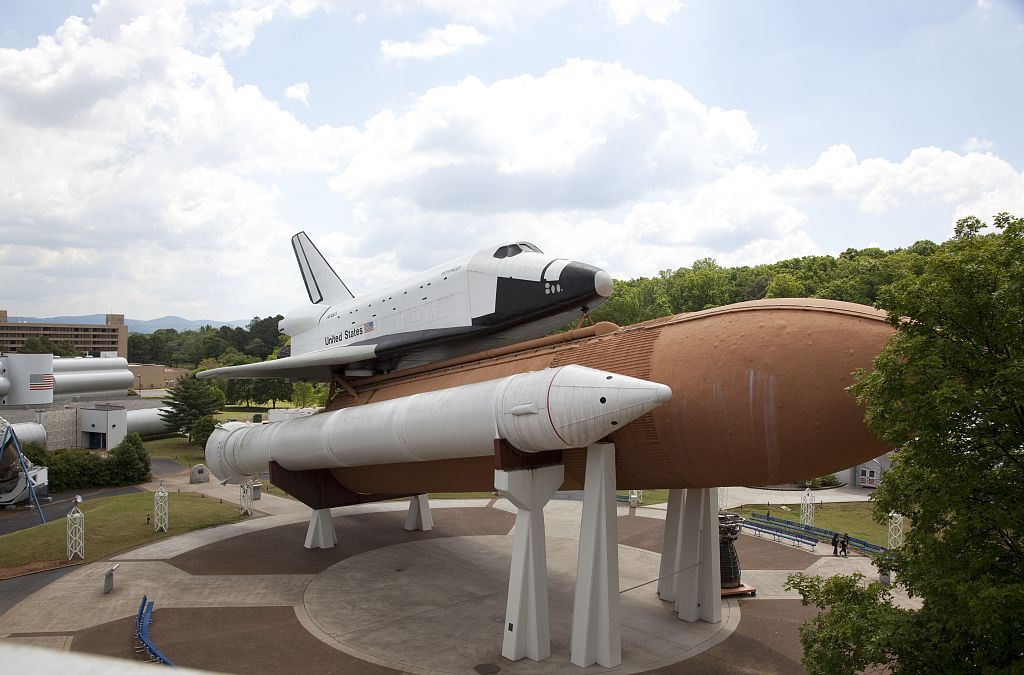
MPTA-ET includes additional internal structural supports to hold the weight of Space Shuttle Pathfinder at the U.S. Space & Rocket Center.

MPTA-ET is on display with the Space Shuttle Pathfinder at the U.S. Space & Rocket Center in Huntsville, Alabama.

ET-94 (older version LWT) is in Los Angeles and in 2019 was scheduled to be displayed with Space Shuttle Endeavour at the California Science Center when the Samuel Oschin Air and Space Center opened. On January 15, 2024, it was announced in a press release that ET-94, 2 solid rocket boosters, and the Space Shuttle Endeavour had been linked together and expected them to be moved by the end of the month to their new exhibit location.

Three other external tanks were in preparation when the manufacturing stopped. ET-139 is at advanced stage of manufacturing; ET-140 and ET-141 are in early stages of manufacturing.

== See also ==
- Space Launch System (a super heavy-lift launch vehicle used for the Artemis program)
- DIRECT (a proposed heavy launch system)
- MPTA-ET (external tank test for STS)
- List of reentering space debris
- List of heaviest spacecraft
