= U.S. Space & Rocket Center =

- Established: 1965
- Location: Huntsville, Alabama
- Coordinates: 34°42′41″N 86°39′15″W
- Type: Science museum
- Owner: State of Alabama
- Website: rocketcenter.com

Association of Science-Technology Centers
- astc.org

The U.S. Space & Rocket Center in Huntsville, Alabama is a museum operated by the government of Alabama, showcasing rockets, achievements, and artifacts of the U.S. space program. Sometimes billed as "Earth's largest space museum", astronaut Owen Garriott described the place as, "a great way to learn about space in a town that has embraced the space program from the very beginning."

The center opened in 1970, just after the Apollo 12 Moon landing, the second crewed mission to the lunar surface. It showcases Apollo Program hardware, including the Apollo 16 capsule, and also houses interactive science exhibits, Space Shuttle exhibits, and Army rocketry and aircraft. With more than 1,500 permanent rocketry and space exploration artifacts, as well as many rotating rocketry and space-related exhibits, the center occupies land carved out of Redstone Arsenal adjacent to Huntsville Botanical Garden at exit 15 on Interstate 565. The center offered bus tours of nearby NASA's Marshall Space Flight Center.

Two camp programs offer visitors the opportunity to stay on the grounds to learn more about spaceflight and aviation. U.S. Space Camp gives an in-depth exposure to the space program through participant use of simulators, lectures, and training exercises. Aviation Challenge offers a taste of military fighter pilot training, including simulations, lectures, and survival exercises. Both camps provide residential and day camp educational programs for children and adults.

== Exhibits ==
The U.S. Space & Rocket Center has one of the most extensive collections of space artifacts and displays more than 1500 pieces. Displays include rockets, engines, spacecraft, simulators, and hands-on exhibits.

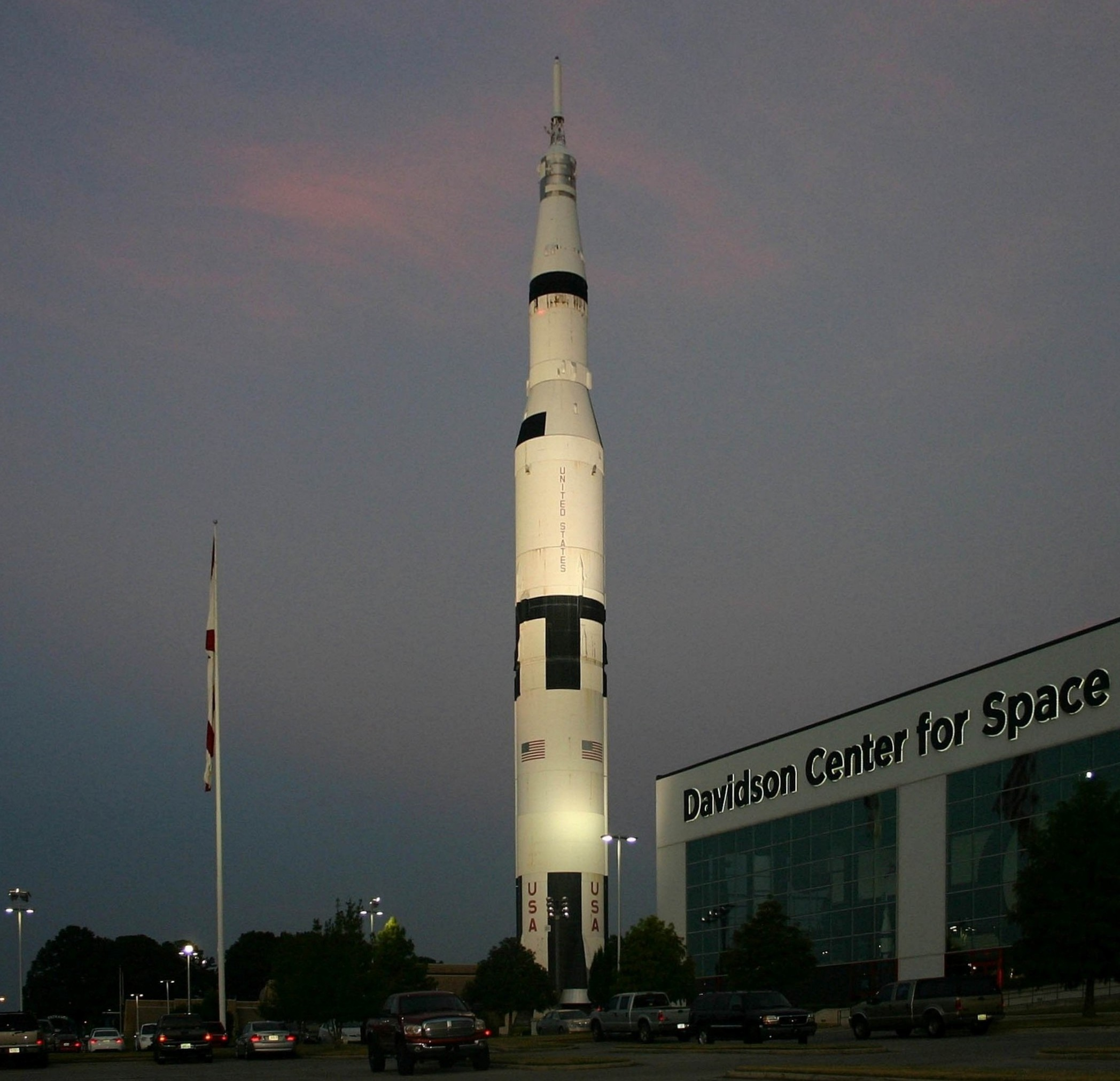
A mock-up display of the Saturn V rocket (scale 1:1) at the U.S. Space & Rocket Center beside the Davidson Center for Space Exploration

The Space & Rocket Center introduces visitors to U.S. rocketry efforts via both indoor and outdoor displays, from its predecessor at Peenemünde with the German V-1 flying bomb and V-2 rocket, through a progression of U.S. military rockets, such as the Redstone and Jupiter IRBM vehicles, and civilian derivatives such as the Mercury-Redstone and the Juno II, up to the Saturn rocket family civilian rockets, including the vertically displayed Saturn I Block 2 Dynamic Test Vehicle, SA-D5, which has become a famous local landmark, and on to the Space Shuttle. The Saturn V Dynamic Test Vehicle, SA-500D, the only Saturn V of the three on display to have been brought together outside a museum, is displayed overhead in a new building designed specifically for the rocket named Davidson Center for Space Exploration. The Space Shuttle Pathfinder, sometimes described as the first manufactured Space Shuttle Orbiter, was a mockup made of steel and wood to test facilities for later handling the actual vehicle. Until it was removed for refurbishment in February 2021 it sat atop an external tank with solid rocket boosters attached. Pathfinder was lifted back into place on the external tank and boosters in September 2024. A homecoming rededication took place on October 24, 2024.

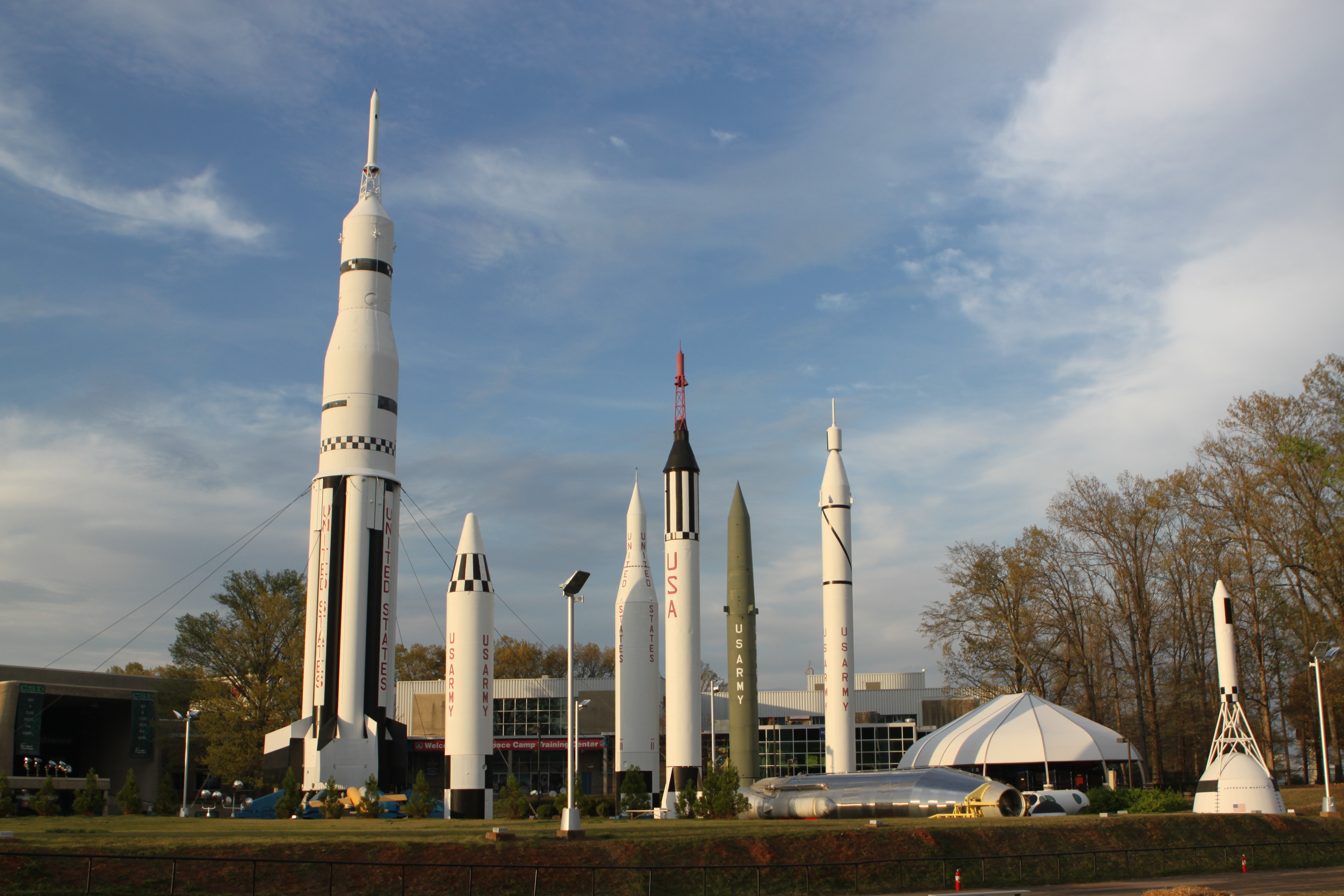
Some of the rockets in the U.S. Space & Rocket Center. From left to right: Saturn I, Jupiter IRBM, Juno II, Mercury-Redstone, Redstone, and Jupiter-C

The center showcases significant military rockets, including representatives of the Project Nike series, which formed the first ballistic missile defense, MIM-23 Hawk surface-to-air missile, Hermes, an early surface-to-surface missile, MGR-1 Honest John and Corporal nuclear missiles and Patriot, first used in the Gulf War of 1991.

The rocketry collection includes numerous engines, as well. In addition to the authentic engines mounted on rockets on display, the museum has unmounted engines on display, including two F-1s, the type of gigantic engine that produced 1,500,000 pounds-force (6,700,000 N) to push Saturn Vs off the launch pad, J-2 engine that powered second and third stages of the Saturn V, and both Descent and Ascent Propulsion System (DPS/APS) engines for the Lunar Module. Engines from the V-2 engine to NERVA to the Space Shuttle Main Engine are on display as well. The rocket park area renovation was completed in November 2024.

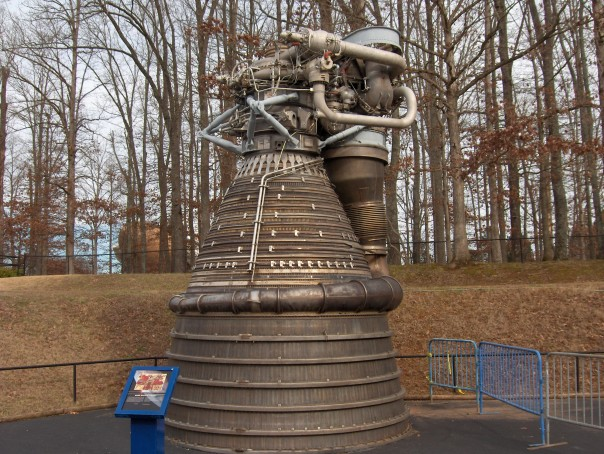
The F-1 rocket engine is 18.5 feet (5.6 m) tall and produced 1,500,000 pounds-force (6,700,000 N) of thrust.

The Apollo program gets full coverage in the Davidson Center for Space Exploration with artifacts outlining Apollo missions. Astronauts crossed the service structure's red walkway to the White Room, both on display, and climbed in the Command Module atop a Saturn V which was their cabin for the trip to the Moon and back. The Apollo 16 command module, which carried astronauts John Young, Charles Duke and Ken Mattingly, orbited the Moon 64 times in 1972, is on display. The Saturn V Instrument Unit controlled five F-1 engines in the first stage of the rocket as it lifted off the pad. Several exhibits relate the complexity and magnitude of that phase of the journey. They took a Lunar Module (mockup on display) to the lunar surface where they collected Moon rocks such as the Apollo 12 Lunar Sample Number 12065,15 at the museum. Later Moon trips took a Lunar Roving Vehicle (displayed beside the LM). The first few Moon trips ended at a Mobile Quarantine Facility (Apollo 12's is on display) where astronauts stayed to ensure containment of any Moon contamination after that mission.

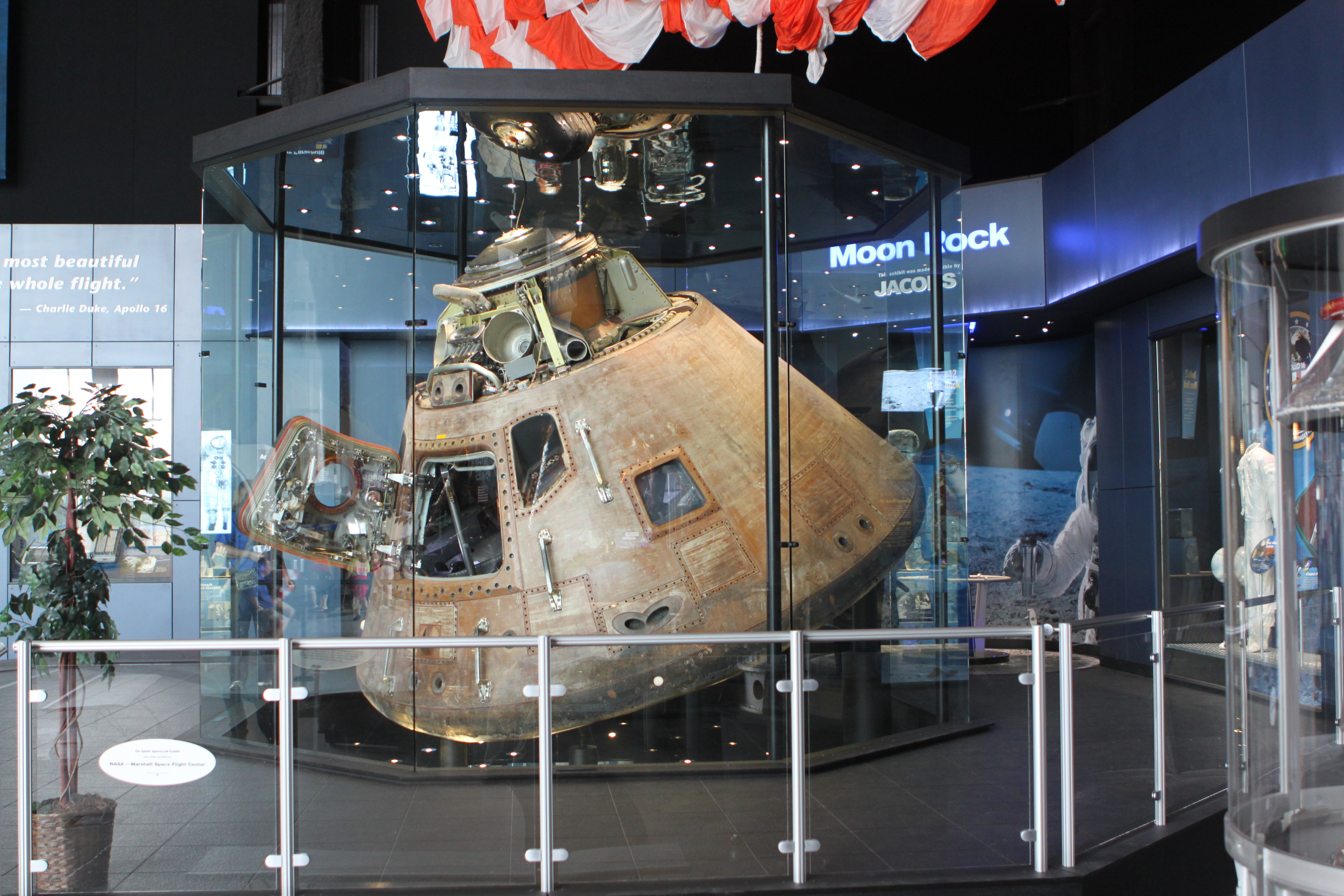
The Apollo 16 capsule, which orbited the Moon 64 times in 1972, is displayed with the recovery parachute hanging above it.

A restored engineering mock-up of Skylab is also on display, showing the Apollo project's post-lunar efforts. Various simulators help visitors understand the spaceflight experience. Space Shot lets the rider experience launch-like 4 gs and 2–3 seconds of weightlessness. G-Force Accelerator offers 3 gs of acceleration for an extended period by means of a centrifuge. Several other simulators entertain and educate visitors.

Other exhibits offer a hands-on understanding of concepts related to rocketry or space travel. A bell jar demonstrates the reason for using a rocket instead of a propeller in the vacuum of space. A wind tunnel offers visitors the opportunity to manipulate a model to see how forces change with its orientation, and The Mind of Saturn exhibit demonstrates gyroscopic force (necessary for rocket navigation). An Apollo trainer offers visitors the opportunity to climb in.

Some simulators on exhibit were used for astronaut training. A Project Mercury simulator shows the cramped conditions endured by the first Americans in space. A Gemini simulator shows visitors the accommodations when two people flew together to space for the first U.S. missions involving extra-vehicular activities and space rendezvous.

Exhibits also cover the future of space flight. Two Orion spacecraft exhibits show the next NASA spacecraft, and a Bigelow Aerospace commercial habitat model details a space tourism effort.

=== Bus tours ===
The Space & Rocket Center offers bus tours of Marshall Space Flight Center. The tour offers views of all four National Historic Landmarks at the center including a stop at the landmark Redstone Test Stand, where Alan Shepard's Redstone Rocket was tested prior to launch. Another scheduled stop is the Payload Operations and Integration Center, which serves as mission control for a number of experiments.

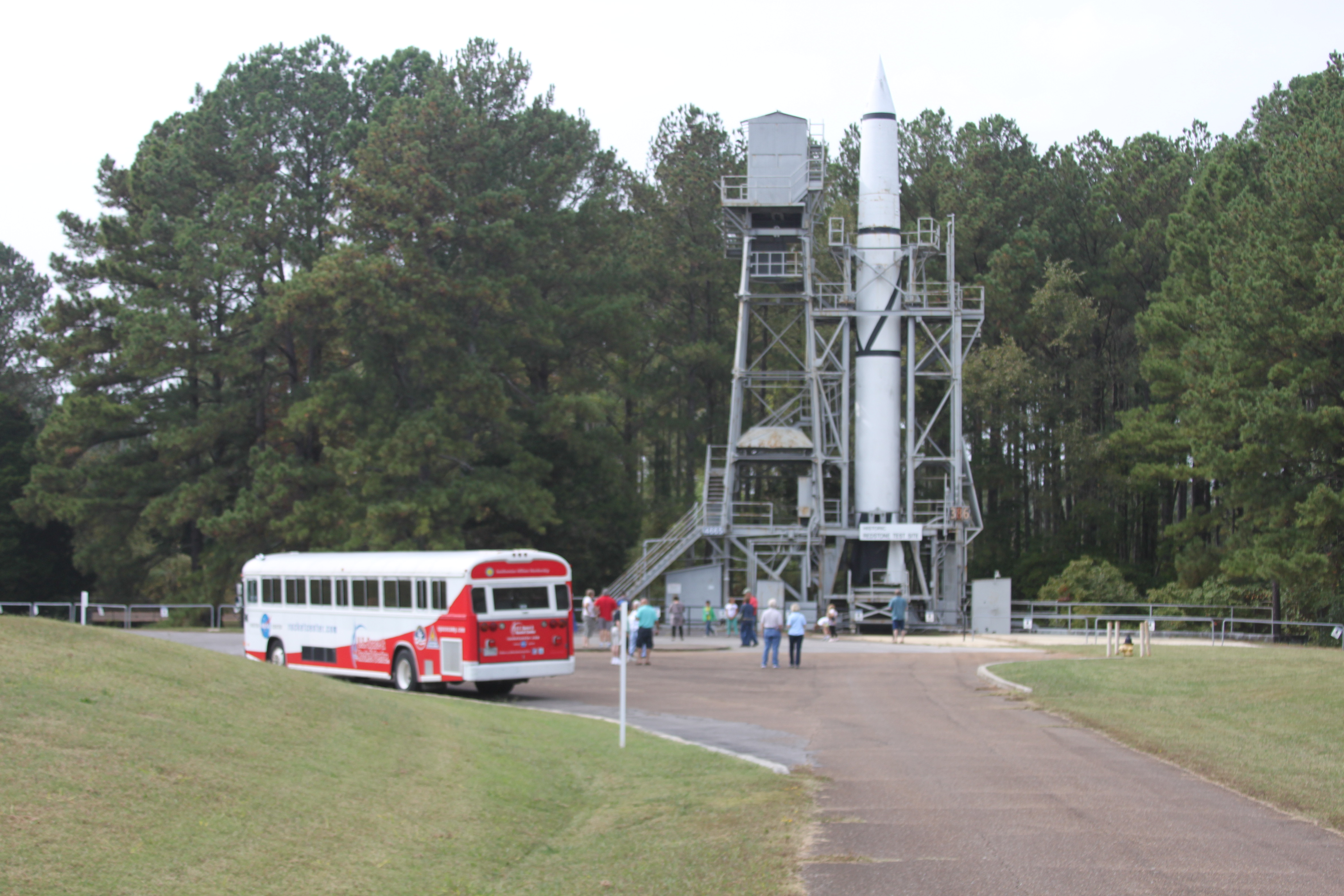
A tour bus waits as tourists inspect the Redstone Test Stand on a 2012 tour of Marshall Space Flight Center.

Bus tours originally started July 4, 1972, but were suspended following the September 11 attacks in 2001. Tours resumed July 20, 2012, the 43rd anniversary of the Apollo 11 Moon landing, limited to U.S. citizens because of security protocol at the Army installation, Redstone Arsenal, which contains Marshall Space Flight Center. As of fall 2025, bus tours of MSFC have been discontinued. The bus tours to see the aircraft inside Space Camp's Aviation Challenge campus are also available on a limited schedule.

=== Traveling exhibits ===
In the summer of 2010, the Space and Rocket Center began hosting traveling exhibits. The first was Star Wars: Where Science Meets Imagination with other exhibits planned. The United States Space Camp hosted at the facility has provided themed camps in conjunction with the exhibits, including a Jedi Experience camp. The last traveling exhibit was featured in 2022.

Other traveling exhibits included:

- The Chronicles of Narnia: The Exhibition Traveling Exhibit
- CSI: The Experience Traveling Exhibit
- A T-Rex Named Sue and Be the Dinosaur
- 100 Years of Von Braun: His American Journey
- Mammoths and Mastodons: Titans of the Ice Age

== Miss Baker gravesite ==
The U.S. Space & Rocket Center is the resting place of Miss Baker, a squirrel monkey who flew on a suborbital test flight of the PGM-19 Jupiter rocket on May 28, 1959. Baker lived in a facility at the center from 1971 until she died of kidney failure in November 1984.

== History ==
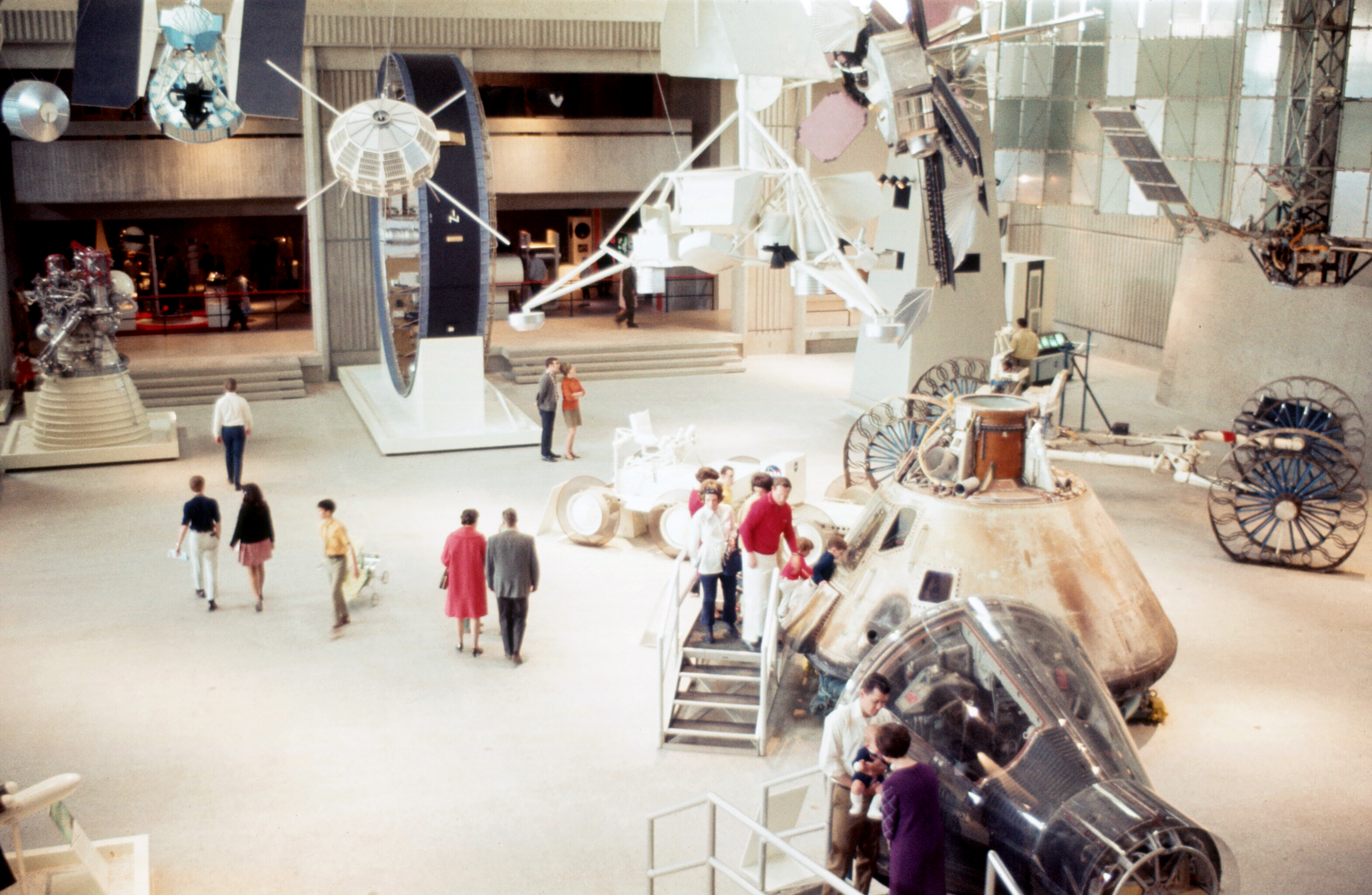
Visitors to the new museum saw Mercury and Apollo 6 capsules, lunar rovers and lander concepts, and more.

The idea for the museum was first proposed by Dr. Wernher von Braun, who led the efforts of the United States to land the first man on the Moon. Plans for the museum were underway in 1960 with an economic feasibility study for the Huntsville-Madison County Chamber of Commerce.

Von Braun, understanding the dominance of football in the Alabama culture, persuaded rival Alabama and Auburn coaches Bear Bryant and Shug Jordan to appear in a television commercial supporting a $1.9 million statewide bond referendum to finance museum construction. The referendum passed on November 30, 1965, and a donation of land from the Army's Redstone Arsenal provided a location on which to build.

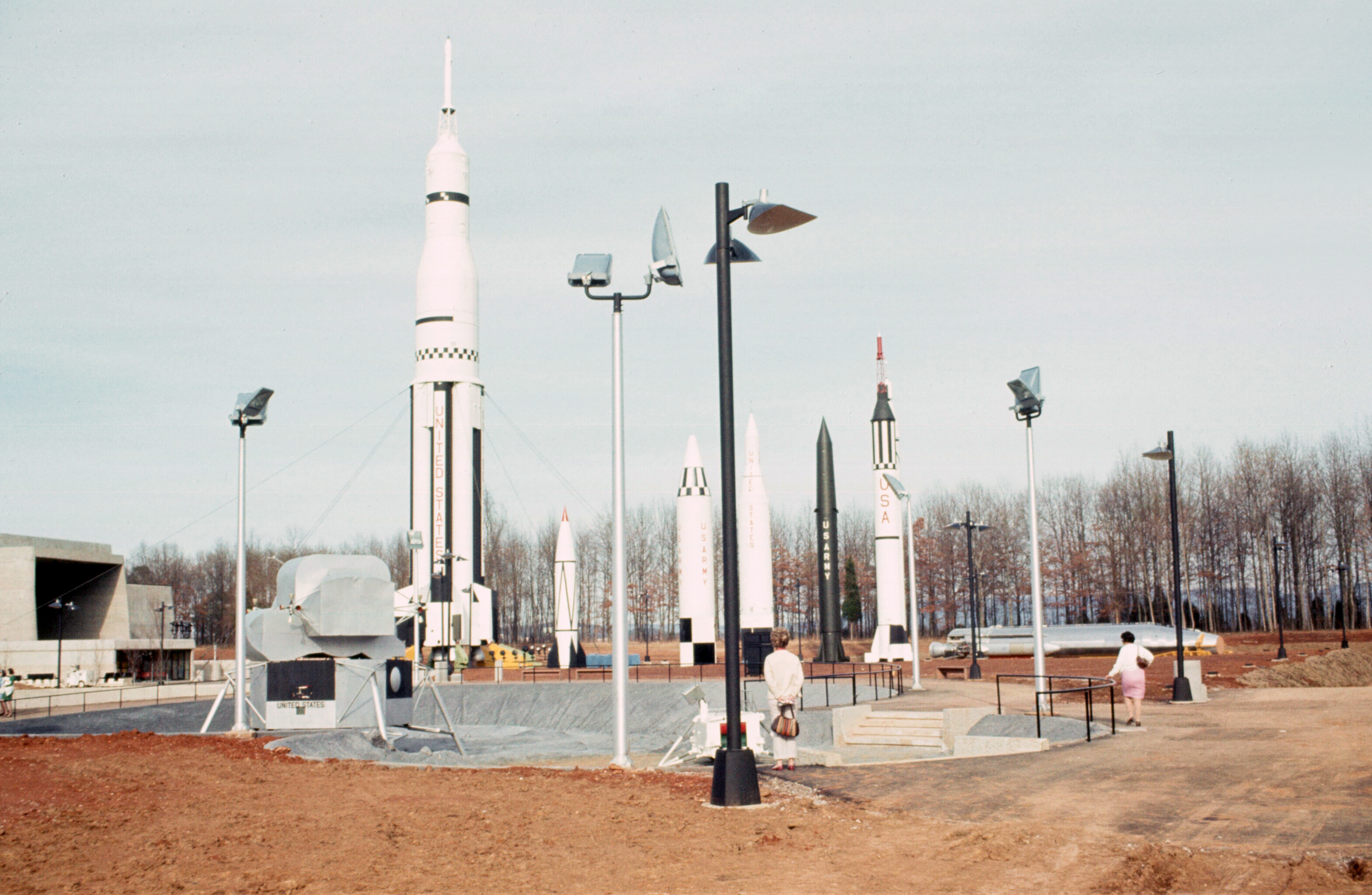
On display immediately were the lunar landscape with lunar lander mockup, and a wide variety of hardware from United States Army Aviation and Missile Command, NASA, and aerospace companies, including a helicopter, and the rocket park.

To help draw tourists from far afield, the center needed a crown jewel. The Huntsville Times reported, Center director "Edward O. Buckbee is the type of guy with the tenacity to 'arrange' for this planet's largest, most complex mechanical beast to become a part of the Alabama Space and Rocket Center at Huntsville. / Pulling off the coup – getting a Saturn 5 moon rocket here which cost 90 times the center itself – was 'a little difficult,' admits Buckbee in a galloping understatement." Buckbee worked with von Braun to see that the Saturn V Dynamic Test Vehicle would be delivered to the site as it was on June 28, 1969. The Saturn I Block 2 Dynamic Test Vehicle which stands erect at the museum was delivered the same day. Initial plans called for visitors to walk through the Saturn V. The center opened on March 17, 1970.

The Space & Rocket Center was a "major sponsor" of the United States pavilion at the 1982 World's Fair, providing exhibits on space and energy as well as equipment and operations for the IMAX theater at the fair. At the time, the Space & Rocket Center also served as the Alabama Energy Information Center. The Spacedome IMAX theater at the museum opened December 19, 1982. The theater closed October 7, 2018 and was converted into the Intuitive Planetarium, featuring high-definition digital projectors, which opened February 28, 2019.

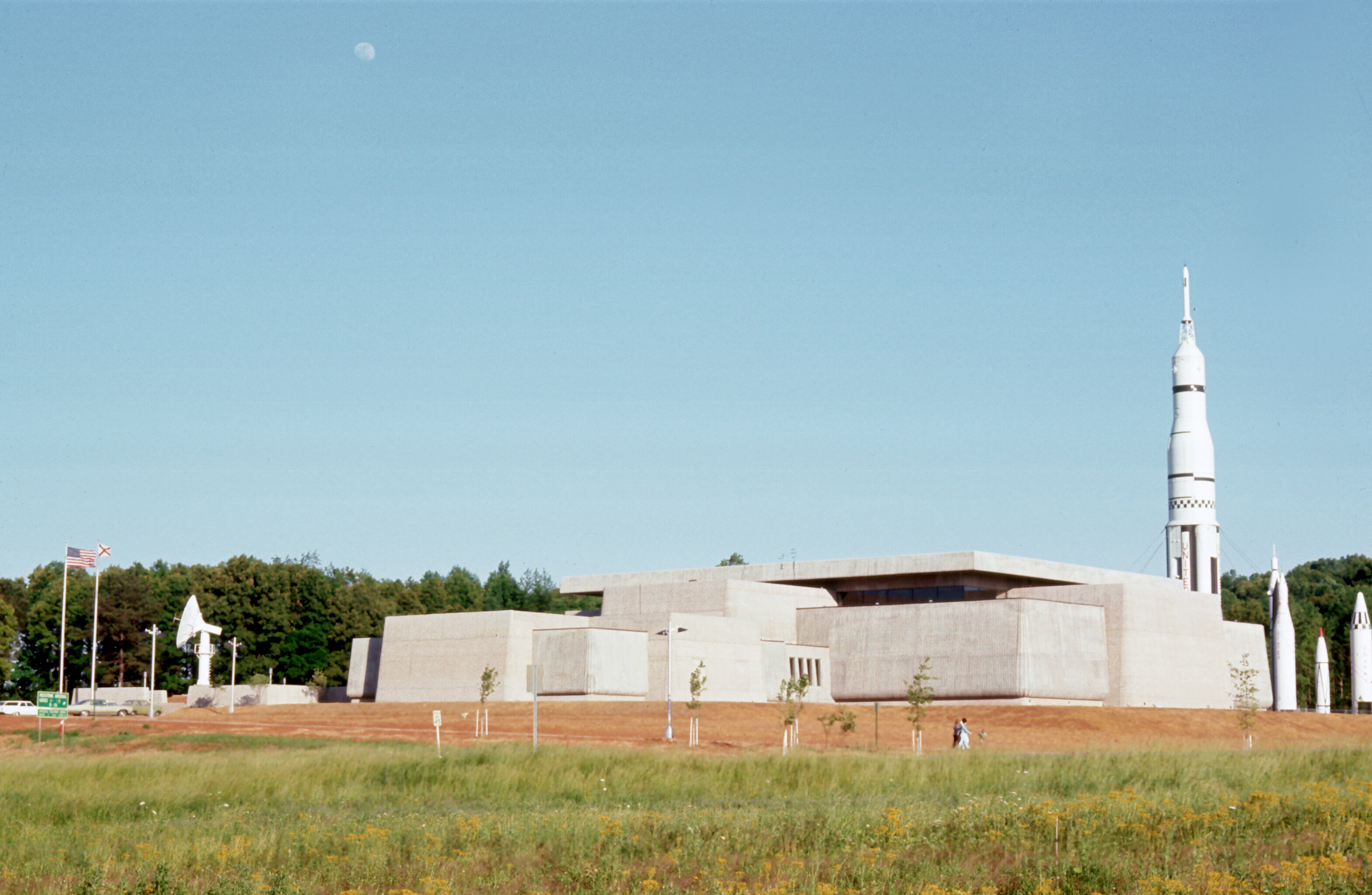
"Early blockhouse modern" describes the architectural style chosen by Huntsville architect David Crowe for the initial museum building.

Mike Wing plunged the Center into debt as its executive director from 1998 to 1999. Wing oversaw construction of a full-scale vertical Saturn V replica to be finished by the 30th anniversary of the Apollo 11 moon landing, July 1999. It serves as a towering landmark in Huntsville, and cost the center $8.6 million of borrowed money. The Huntsville Times estimated interest costs at $10 million. Wing also sought to create a program for fifth grade students in Alabama and elsewhere to attend Space Camp at no cost to them. Anonymous corporate pledges that Wing promised would fund the $800 per student never arrived. Wing prolonged the Alabama Space Science Exhibit Commission's investigation into the pledges by writing bogus personal checks and having the center record them as received. The program ultimately cost the center $7.5 million. Wing was pressured to resign, and several members of the governing Alabama Space Science Exhibit Commission were ousted from that board as a result of the debacle. At the end of Wing's term as director, the center was $26 million in debt. The state sued Wing for $7.5 million over the Space Camp fraud. They settled for $500,000.

The expenditures would shape more than the next decade for the center. Bill Stender took over from ousted Wing as acting chief executive officer on October 14, 1999.

The board of directors was largely changed out in the shakeup removing Wing. New directors included Larry Capps who was selected to head the museum on February 9, 2000, after Stender's interim appointment. He reduced the debt to $16 million while also building the Davidson Center for Space Exploration and moving the Saturn V Dynamic Test Vehicle into its custom-built facility. Capps was director through his retirement in 2010.

Dr. Deborah Barnhart, who headed Space Camp from 1986 to 1990, was selected to run the museum in 2010. She has since brought Orion and other post-Shuttle training apparatus to Space Camp and retired the center's line of credit, reducing interest expenditures. The center had about $13 million debt in May 2014. Barnhart retired in December 2019.

In July 2020, the center put out a plea for donations to help make ends meet since two–thirds of revenue had been lost due to shutdowns and cancellations from the COVID-19 pandemic, and because of the center's unique governance, it was not eligible for any state or federal bailout programs. After a week, the center's fundraiser met its $1.5 million goal to continue operations through April 2021.

On December 15, 2020, the Alabama Space Science Exhibit Commission announced that Dr. Kimberly Robinson would be the next director, starting on February 15, 2021, until June 2025.

On Thursday, May 21, 2026, the U.S. Space and Rocket Center Commission voted to name Tina Tucker as the center's new CEO, starting on July 6, 2026.

== Buildings ==
Huntsville architect David Crowe designed the initial building with 22,000 square feet (2,000 m^{2}) of exhibit space. Since 1969, Huntsville residents could point to the vertical Saturn I rocket at the U.S. Space & Rocket Center as a distant landmark (located a few miles from the city center). In 1999, a full-scale model of the Saturn V rocket was erected, standing nearly twice as tall as the Saturn I.

From 1979 to 2023 an unflown Saturn IB rocket owned by MSFC and leased to the museum stood at the Alabama Welcome Center in Ardmore "as a reminder to visitors of Alabama's role in the space program." It was removed and salvaged due to lack of maintenance in September 2023.

The dome theater addition opened December 19, 1982, and was updated in early 2019 to be the INTUITIVE Planetarium.

The 1986 film SpaceCamp promoted the camp and inspired more than a doubling of camp attendees (from 5,000 in 1986 to 11,000 in 1987), and the facilities had to be expanded again.

A $3 million NASA Educator Resource Center was built during Larry Capps's tenure, opening mid-2005.

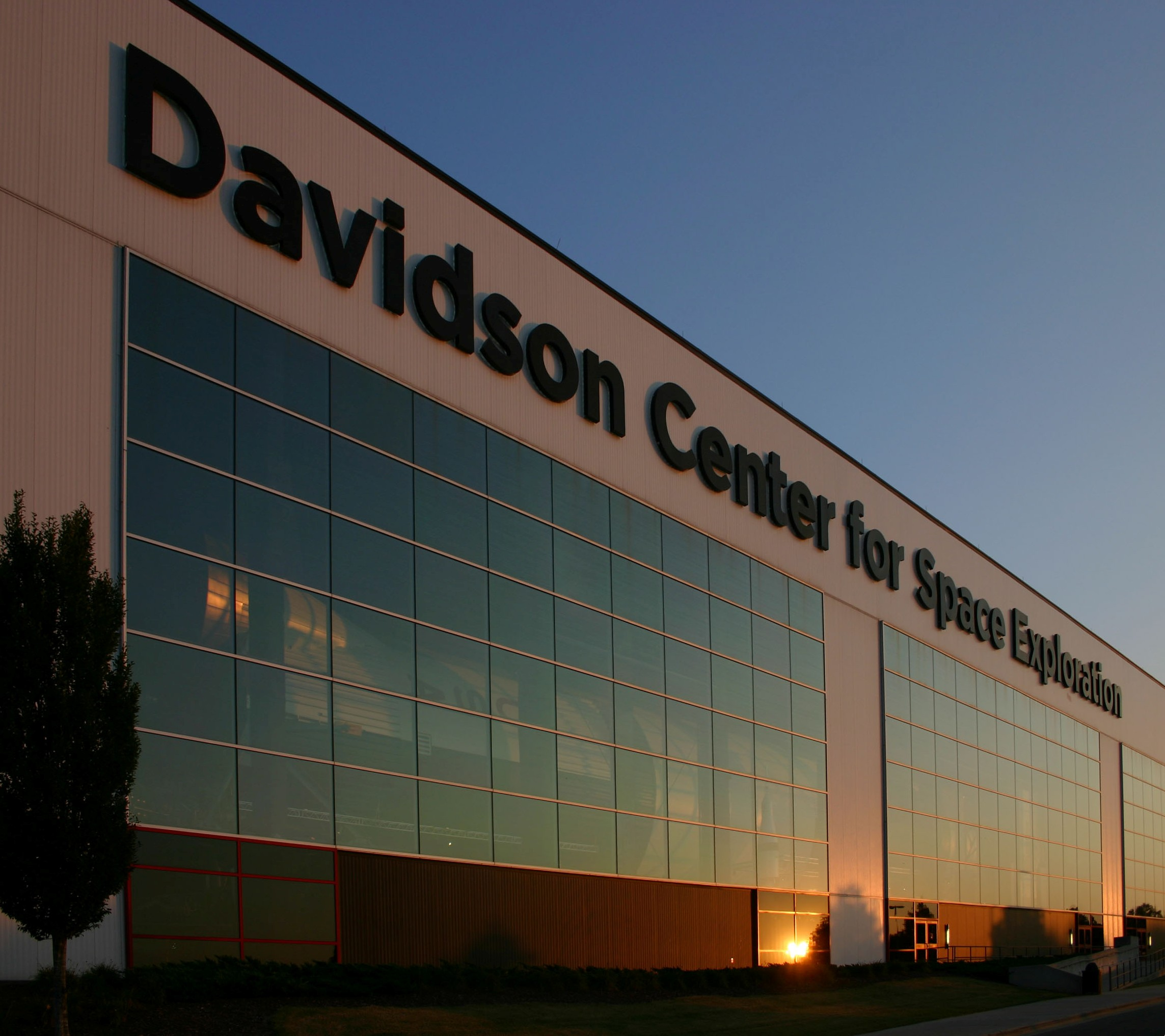
Front side of the Davidson Center for Space Exploration

The newest addition to the U.S. Space & Rocket Center is the Davidson Center for Space Exploration, named after Dr. Julian Davidson, founder of Davidson Technologies. The 68,000 square feet (6,300 m^{2}) building opened January 31, 2008. The Davidson Center was designed to house the Saturn V Dynamic Test Vehicle (listed on the National Register of Historic Places) and many other space exploration exhibits. The vehicle is elevated above the floor surface with separated stages and engines exposed, so visitors have the opportunity to walk underneath the rocket. The Davidson Center also features a 3D movie theater in addition to the planetarium in the original museum.

== Governance ==
The U.S. Space & Rocket Center is owned by the State of Alabama and operated by the Alabama Space Science Exhibit Commission (ASSEC), whose 18 members are appointed by the Governor for terms of four or eight years. The composition and authority of the board are set forth in Title 41, Article 15 of the Code of Alabama. ASSEC meetings are open to the public.

The U.S. Space & Rocket Center Foundation is a nonprofit organization that raises funds for the ASSEC.

== Visitors ==
The Space & Rocket Center saw 540,153 visitors in 2010 and 553,137 in 2011, and over 584,000 in 2013, the latter earning the museum recognition as the top paid-tourist attraction in Alabama. In 2017, more than 786,820 people visited the center, ranking it first among state attractions that charge admission, according to the Alabama Department of Tourism.

The NASA Human Exploration Rover Challenge, previously known as the Great Moonbuggy Race, has run every year since 1994, and all but the first two have been held at the Space & Rocket Center. The race challenges high school and college students to design and build a small moonbuggy that they can assemble on-site and ride across a simulated lunar terrain.

== In popular culture ==
The U.S. Space & Rocket Center was the setting for feature films SpaceCamp (1986), Beyond the Stars (1989), and Space Warriors (2013), along with the 2012 made-for-TV movie A Smile as Big as the Moon.

The U.S. Space & Rocket Center was the site of a Roadblock and Pit Stop at the end of Leg 3 of The Amazing Race: Family Edition aired in October 2005.

Good Morning America has featured the Space & Rocket Center multiple times. In their 2006 proclamation the "Seven Wonders of America", GMA selected the Saturn V and particularly featured the Saturn V Dynamic Test Vehicle at the U.S. Space & Rocket Center.
