= KMEB =

KMEB may refer to:

- Laurinburg–Maxton Airport, North Carolina, US, ICAO airport code KMEB
- KMEB (TV), a TV station in Honolulu, Hawaii, US
