= Space Shuttle Independence =

Space Shuttle replica

Coordinates: 29.552036°N 95.097244°W

Independence
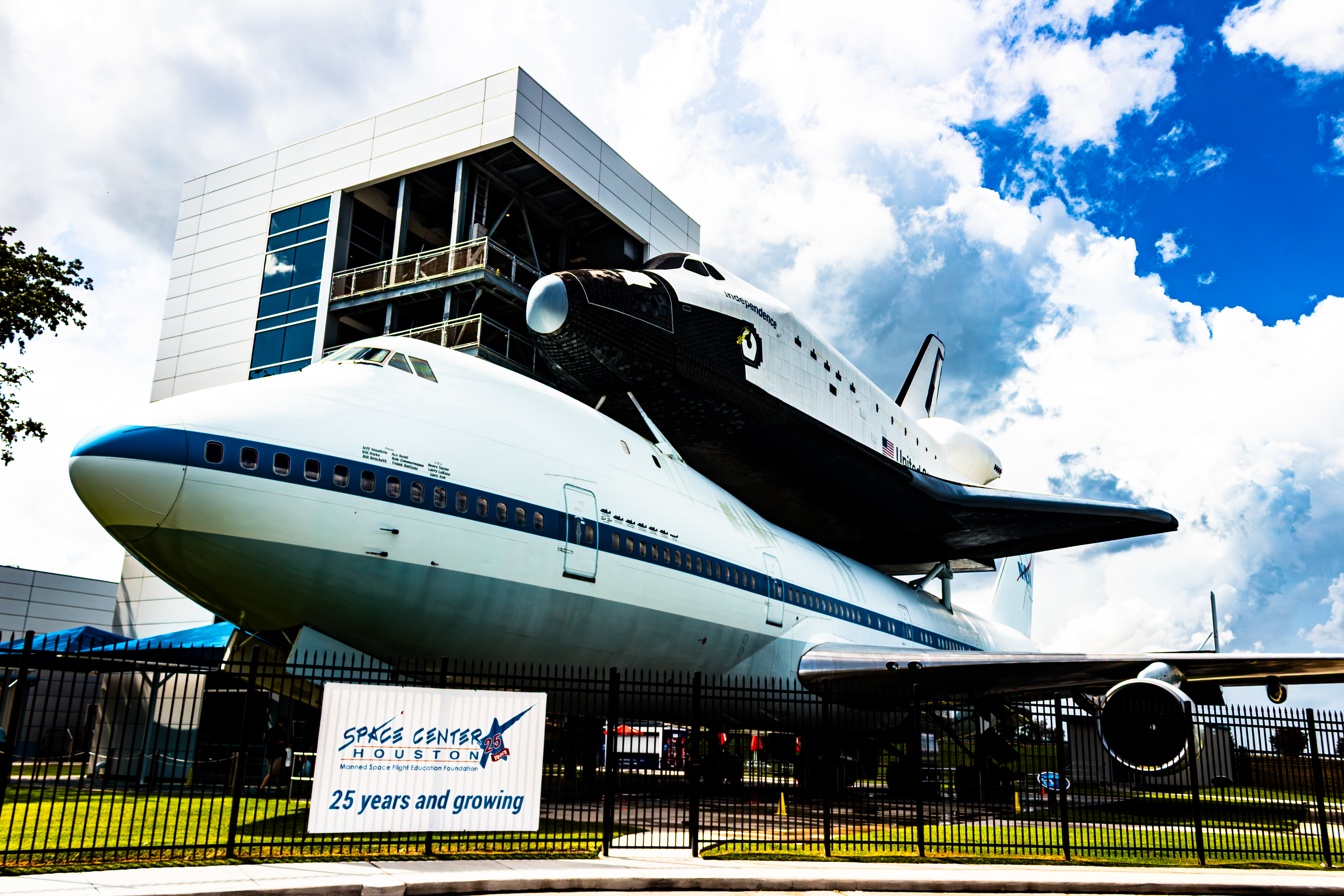
- Shuttle Independence and NASA 905 in Independence Plaza at Space Center Houston
- Country: United States
- Contract award: Guard-Lee
- Status: On display at Space Center Houston

Space Shuttle Independence, formerly known as Explorer, is a full-scale, high-fidelity replica of the Space Shuttle orbiter. It was built by Guard-Lee in Apopka, Florida, installed at Kennedy Space Center Visitor Complex in 1993, and moved to Space Center Houston in 2012. It was built using schematics, blueprints and archival documents provided by NASA and by shuttle contractors such as Rockwell International. While many of the features on the replica are simulated, some parts, including the landing gear's Michelin tires, have been used in the Space Shuttle program. The model is 122.7 ft (37.4 m) long, 54 ft (16 m) high, has a 78 ft (24 m) wingspan, and weighs 171,860 lb (77,950 kg).

== Kennedy Space Center ==
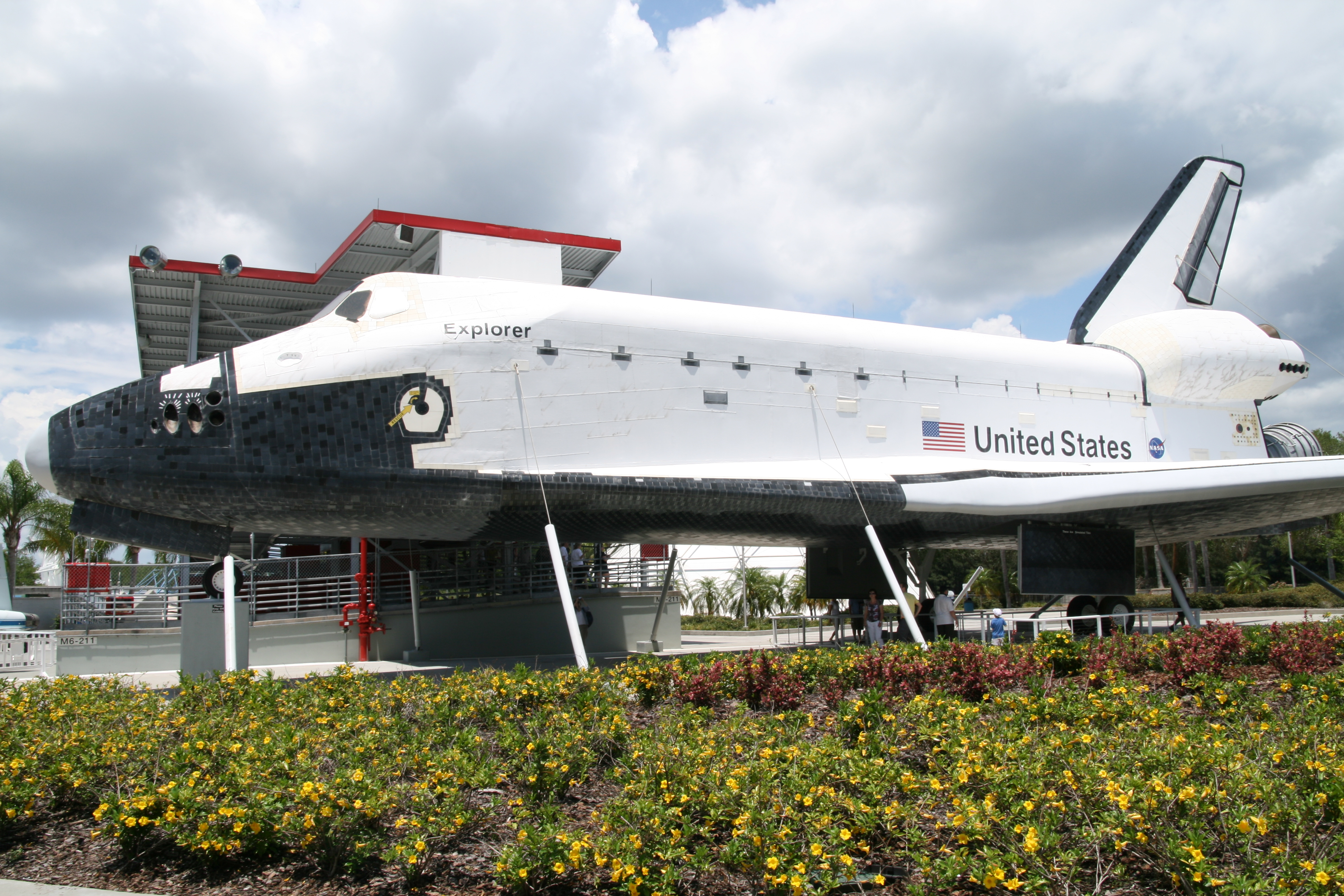
Space Shuttle replica Explorer at Kennedy Space Center, Florida

Explorer was displayed at the Kennedy Space Center Visitor Complex atop concrete pilings and secured with steel cabling. Visitor access was provided by a gantry-style tower with ramps and an elevator for accessibility. Inside, visitors could view a mock-up payload, a mannequin wearing an early model of the orange launch/entry pressure suit used by shuttle astronauts, and a mock cockpit with controls and instruments. Adjacent to Explorer were two solid rocket boosters mated to a full-size mock-up of an external tank (originally used by Stennis Space Center for fit tests).

== Space Center Houston ==
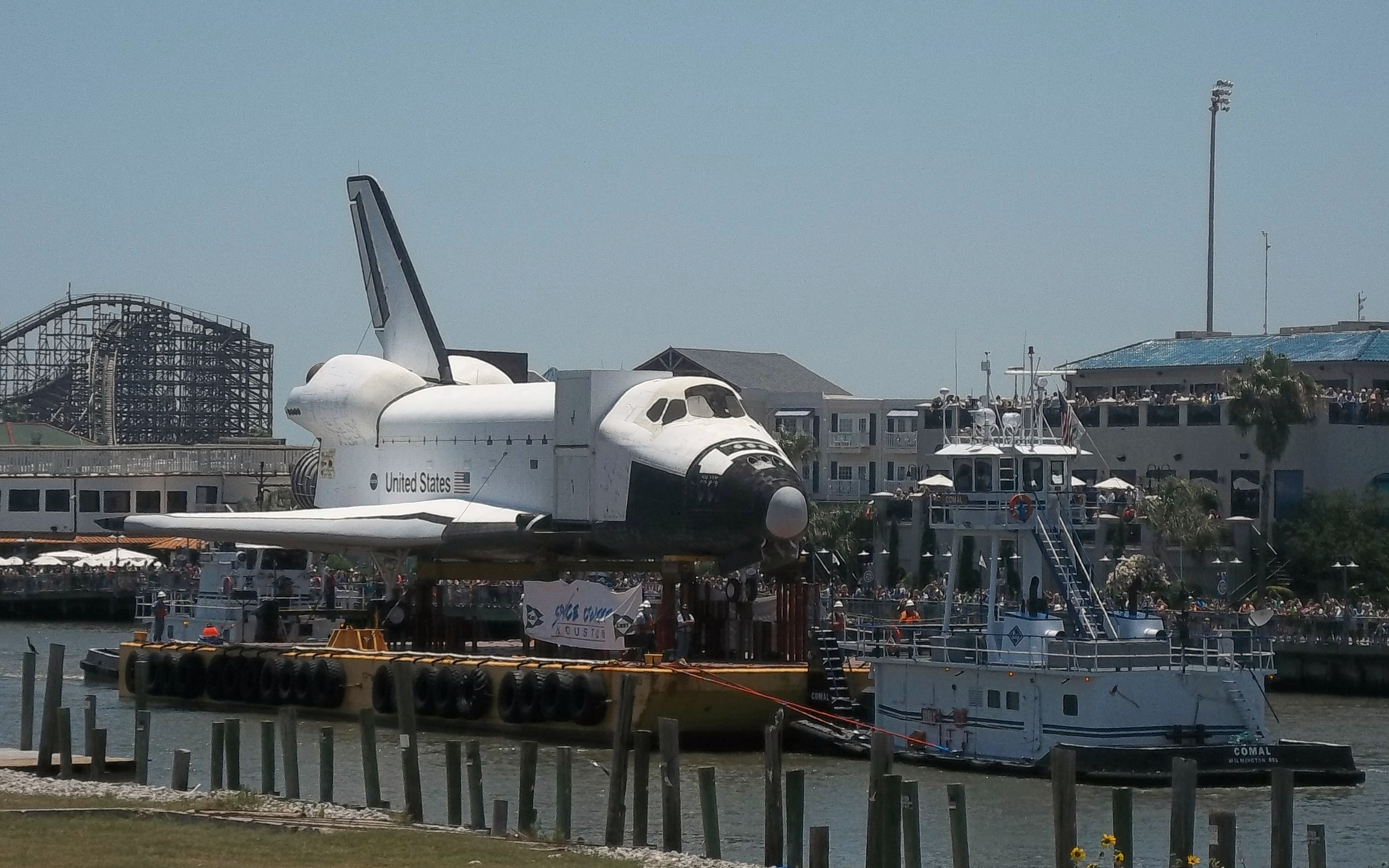
Tugboats take Explorer into Clear Lake from Galveston Bay.

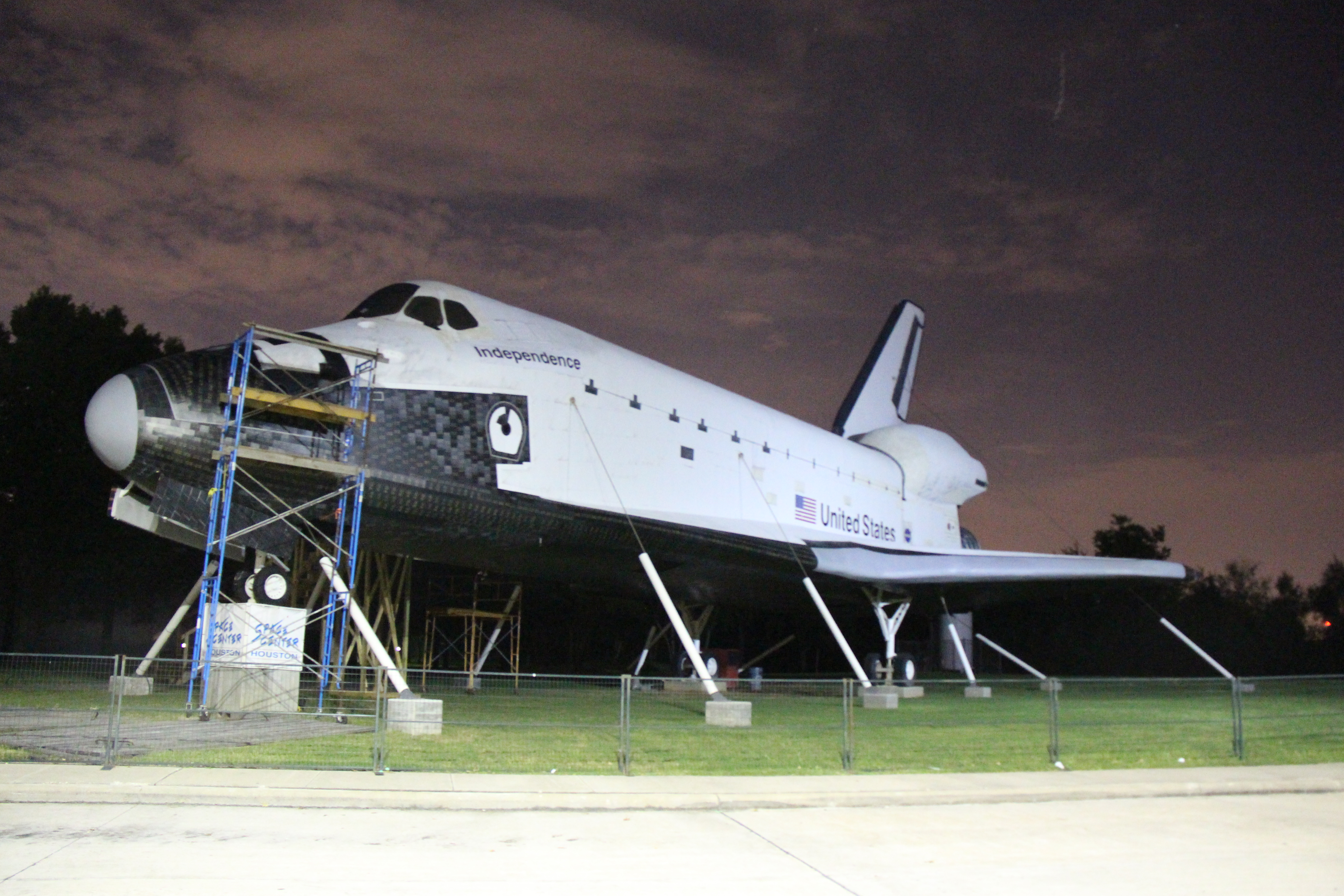
Independence on display at Space Center Houston

Because Kennedy Space Center was to receive the retired Atlantis, Space Shuttle Explorer was removed from the KSC Visitor Center on December 11, 2011, and relocated to the Vehicle Assembly Building's turn basin dock adjacent to the Launch Complex 39 Press Site. The move was performed by Beyel Bros. using a 144-wheel trailer towed by truck. To accommodate the shuttle, several light poles and street signage along the route were taken down, and the shuttle itself was lifted by hydraulic jacks over a KSC guardhouse.

The vehicle remained at the turn basin until May 24, 2012, when it began its move by barge to the Lyndon B. Johnson Space Center outside Houston, Texas. The replica shuttle was stripped of the name Explorer as part of the dismantling process.

Upon arriving in the Houston area by barge on June 1, 2012, guided by the Presiding Officer of the Houston Pilots Robert Thompson, the shuttle was taken to the Johnson Space Center dock on Clear Lake, and preparations were made to move the shuttle to Space Center Houston during the early morning hours. As with Florida, several light poles along NASA Parkway were taken down and trees trimmed back to allow passage. The shuttle was moved by another 144-wheel trailer down the closed highway to the visitor center.

Johnson Space Center hosted a celebration for the arrival of the replica. "Shuttlebration" events began on June 1, at the southeast corner of Clear Lake by the Nassau Bay Hilton Hotel. The festivities included the arrival of the shuttle at the dock and its move onto visitor center grounds. This was the largest item to arrive at the JSC dock since a Saturn V arrived for display in 1977.

Space Center Houston announced on May 2, 2013, that it had acquired NASA 905, one of NASA's two modified Boeing 747 Shuttle Carrier Aircraft. The center planned to display the replica shuttle atop the SCA with interiors of both vehicles accessible to visitors. A competition to name the shuttle opened on July 4, 2013, and concluded on September 2, 2013, with over 10,000 entries received. The winning entry was submitted by Timothy Judd, and the new name, Independence, was revealed on October 5, 2013.

Independence underwent extensive renovation in 2013 and 2014 to repair damaged components and update its appearance to more closely match that of the modern shuttle fleet. Modifications include a re-skinning of the exterior, replica thermal tiles, publicly accessible mid-deck and payload bay, a glass cockpit on the flight deck, and display cases with shuttle program artifacts.

On August 14, 2014, a heavy lift was completed to place Independence on top of NASA 905, which had been moved to Space Center Houston from Ellington Field on April 30, 2014. The combined exhibit, named "Independence Plaza", opened to the public on January 23, 2016, at an estimated cost of US$12 million.

== Gallery ==
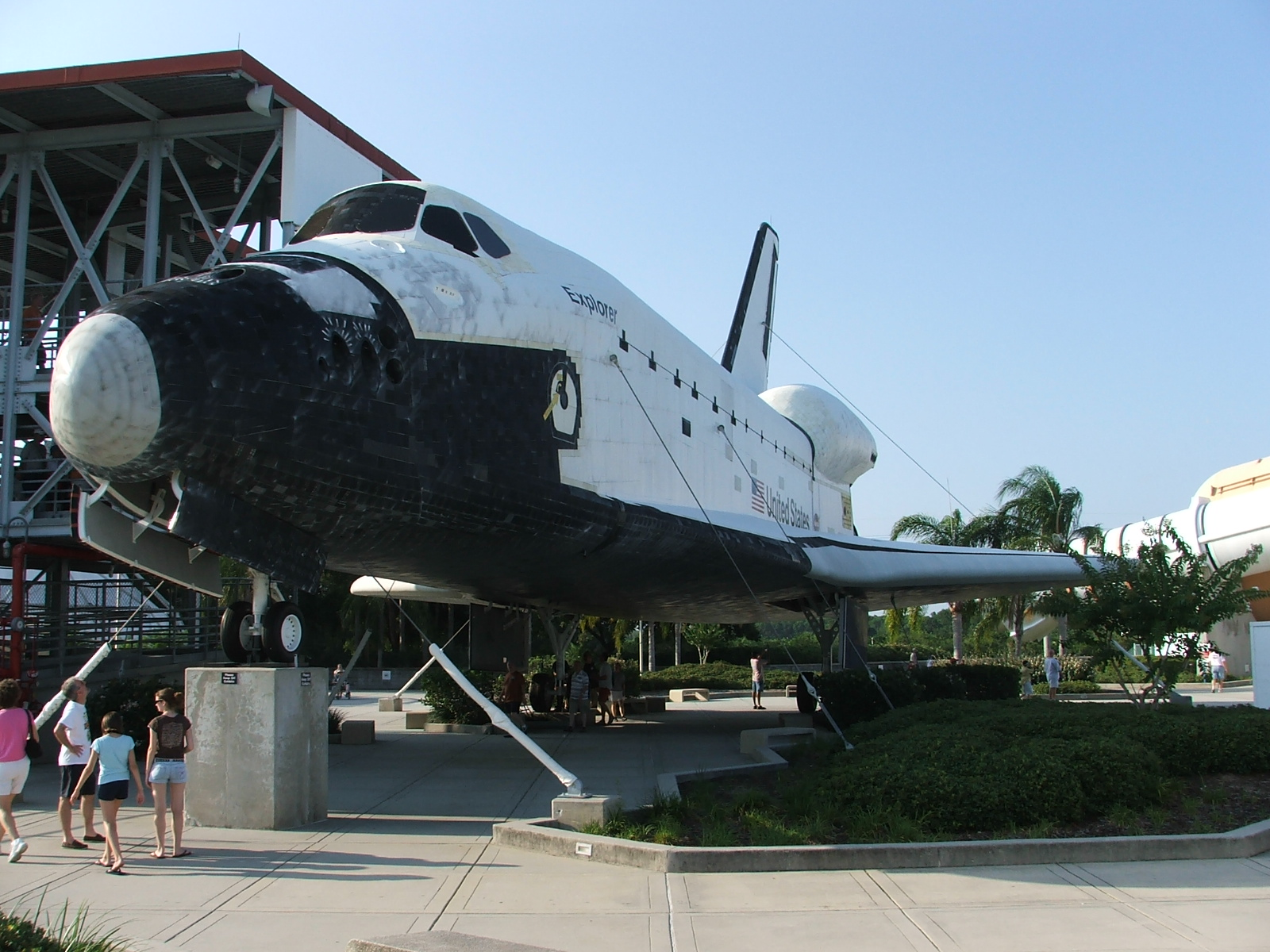
Shuttle mock-up Explorer at Kennedy Space Center

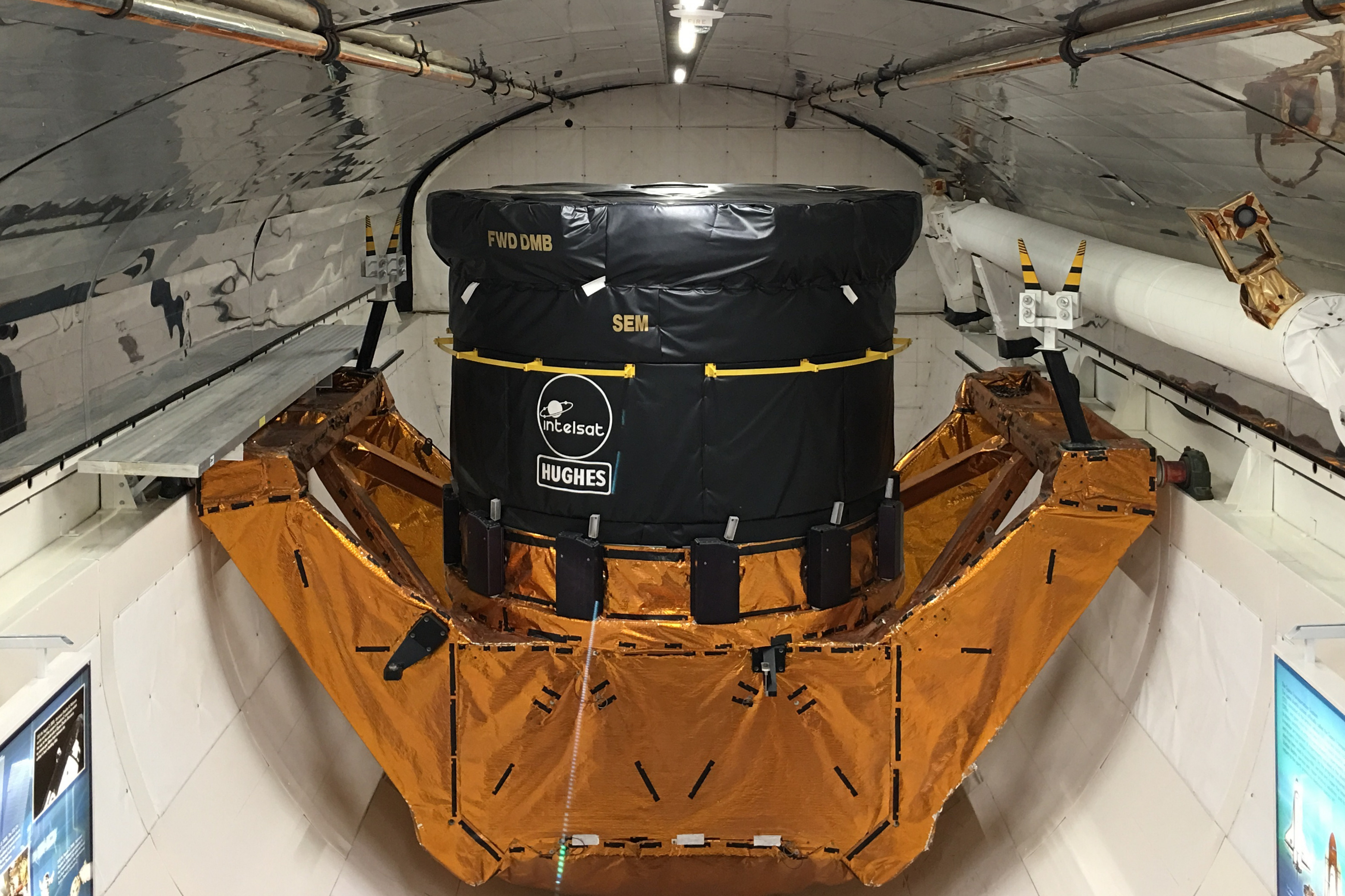
Mock-up of an Orbus 21 kickmotor in Independence, similar to one carried on STS-49 for attachment to Intelsat 603

== See also ==
- Space Shuttle Pathfinder
- Space Shuttle Inspiration
