= Space Center Houston =

Science museum at NASA Space Center, Houston, Texas

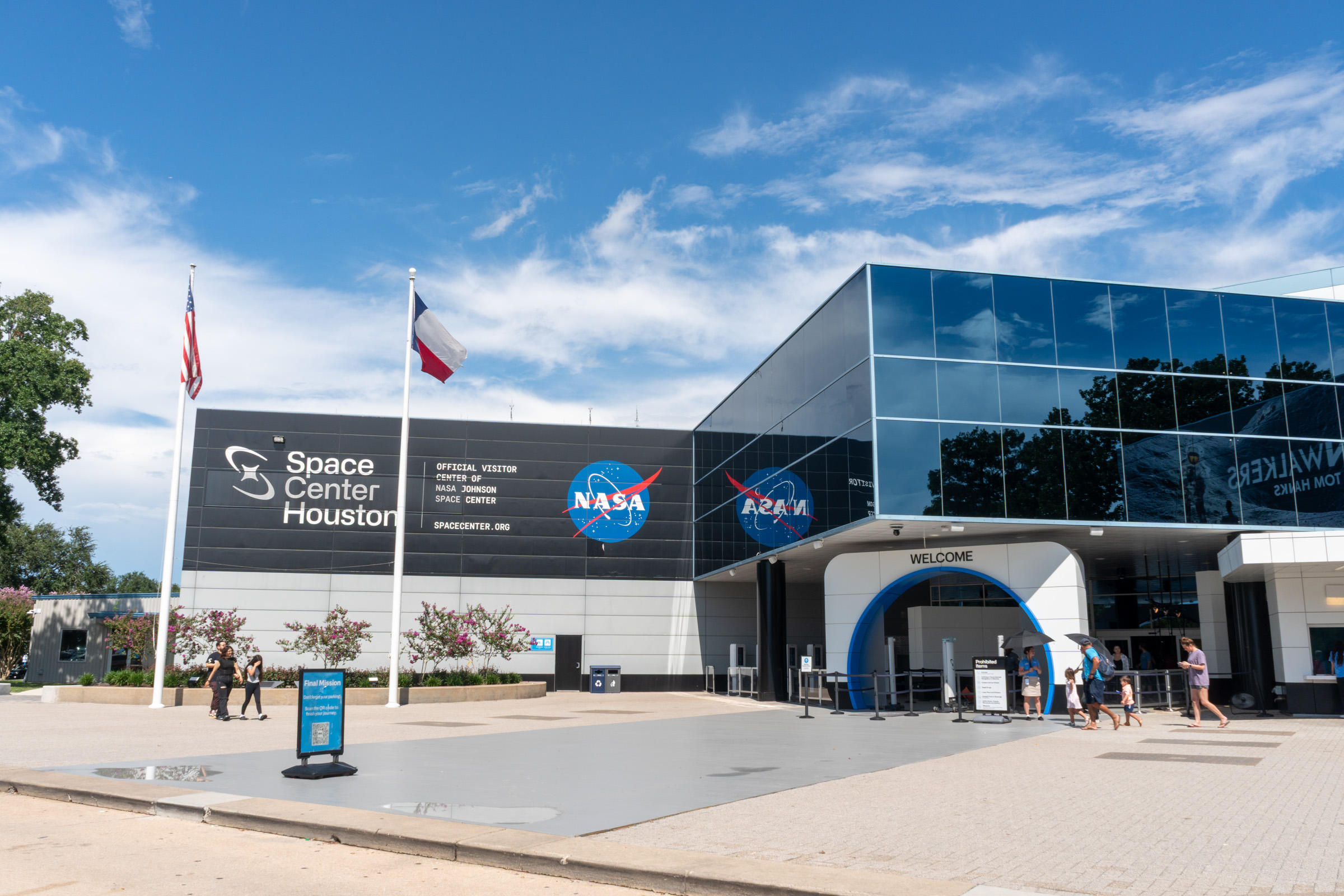
- Entrance to the Space Center Houston
- Interactive map of Space Center Houston
- Location: 1601 NASA Parkway; Houston, Texas 77058 US
- Coordinates: 29°33′07″N 95°05′54″W
- Status: Operating
- Opened: October 16, 1992
- Owner: NASA
- Operated by: Manned Spaceflight Education Foundation
- Theme: NASA and space exploration
- Operating season: Closed on Christmas Day and Thanksgiving
- Attendance: >1 million (2022)
- Website: spacecenter.org

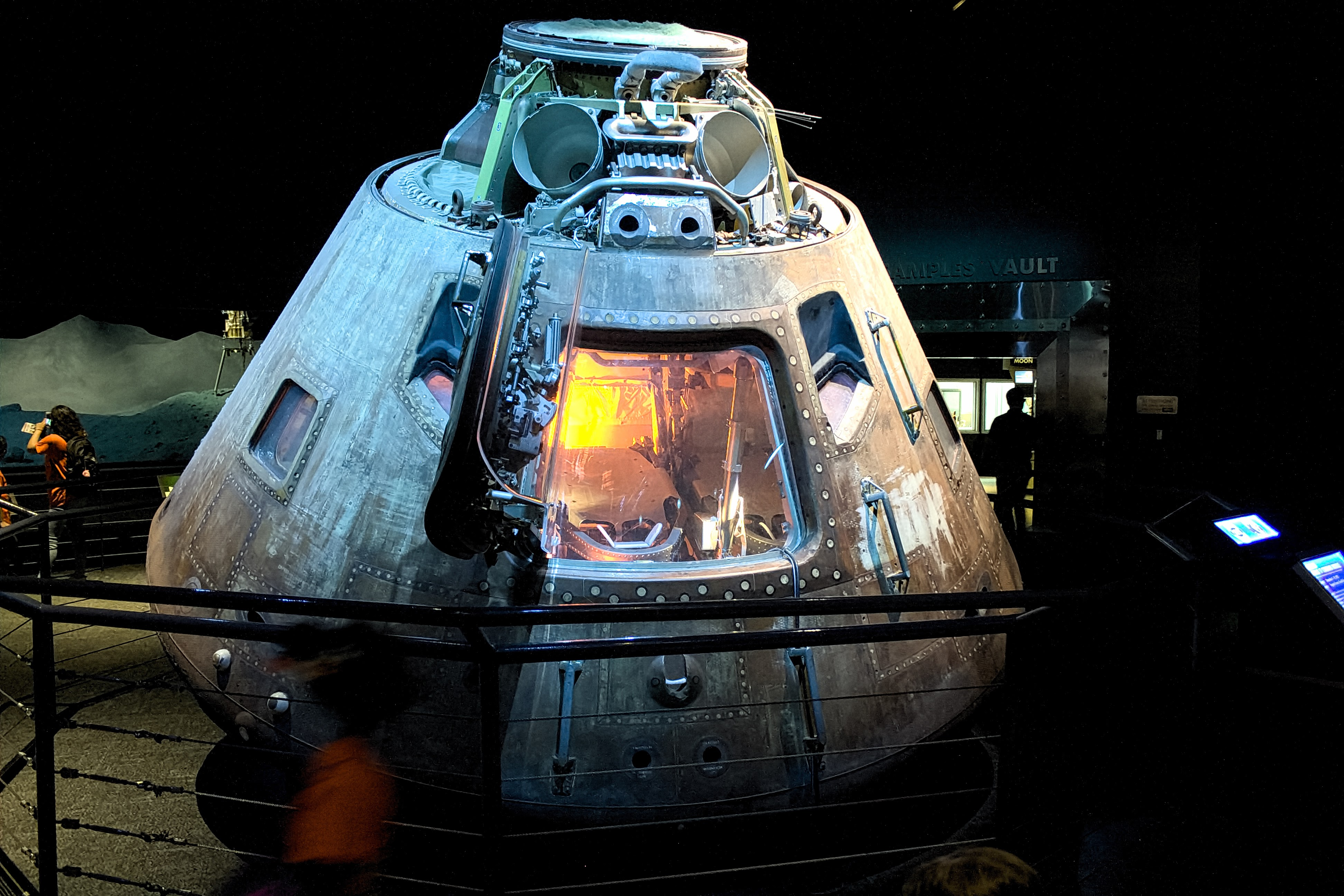
The Apollo 17 command module America is on exhibit at the Space Center

Space Center Houston is a science museum that serves as the official visitor center of the NASA Johnson Space Center in Houston, Texas. It was designated a Smithsonian Affiliate museum in 2014. The organization is not owned by NASA and does not receive federal funds – it is the cornerstone project of the nonprofit Manned Space Flight Education Foundation, a 501(c)(3) organization. The center does have a strong partnership with NASA Johnson Space Center, the home of Mission Control and astronaut training, which affords the center access to tour the grounds and some buildings with the general public.

The center opened in 1992 replacing the former Visitor Center in Johnson Space Center Building 2. The museum is 250,000 square feet (23,000 m^{2}) and displays over 400 space artifacts, including the Mercury 9, Gemini 5, and Apollo 17 flown space capsules and the only space shuttle visitors can walk inside.

== Starship gallery ==
This artifact gallery includes three flown spacecraft, several used in training, and a display of Moon rocks:

- Mercury 9 capsule (Faith 7) flown by Gordon Cooper in 1963
- Gemini 5 capsule flown by Gordon Cooper and Pete Conrad in 1965
- Apollo 17 Command Module America flown by Gene Cernan, Ronald Evans, and Dr. Harrison "Jack" Schmitt, along with a biological contingent of five mice, orbited the Moon a record 75 times in 1972 during the last crewed Lunar mission
- Lunar Module test vehicle LTA-8
- Lunar Roving Vehicle Trainer
- Lunar Samples Vault
- Lunar touchstone, one of only eight Moon rocks in the world that can be touched
- Skylab 1-G Trainer
- Apollo-Soyuz Test Project docking module trainer

== Independence Plaza ==
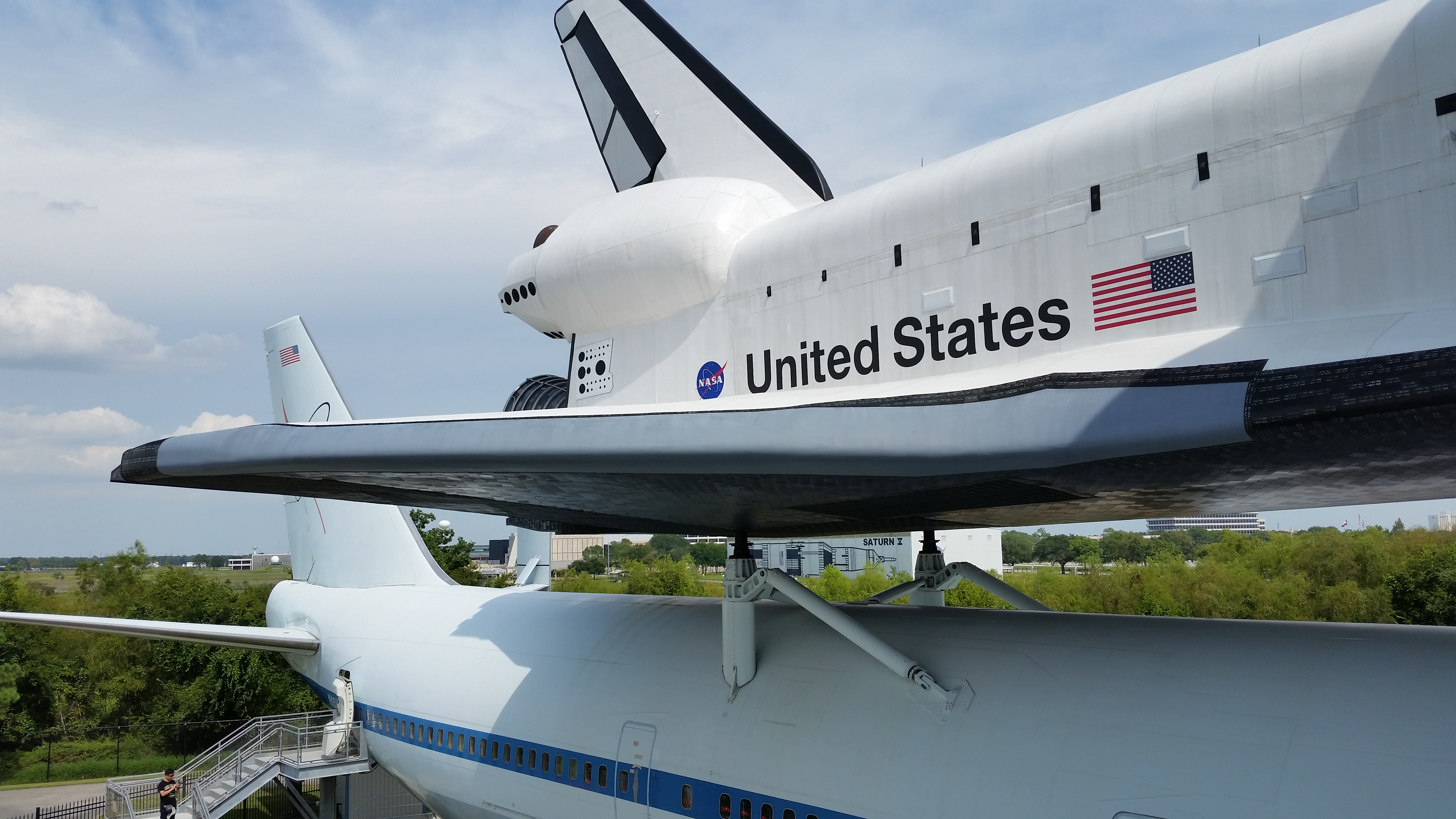
The Space Shuttle replica Independence sits atop the Shuttle Carrier Aircraft 905, one of the two Shuttle Carrier Aircraft, with the Johnson Space Center and Rocket Park in the background

Space Center Houston is the home of the Independence Plaza exhibit complex. This attraction contains the world's only high-fidelity Space Shuttle replica, where it stands mounted on one of the two original shuttle carrier aircraft. Independence Plaza is the only place where the public can enter both vehicles. The Space Shuttle replica Independence, formerly known as Explorer, was previously located at Kennedy Space Center Visitor Complex, but was moved to make way for a new permanent attraction hall for Space Shuttle Atlantis. Independence is now displayed atop the retired Shuttle Carrier Aircraft, NASA 905. On August 14, 2014, a heavy lift called The Rise of Independence was completed to place Independence on top of NASA 905. The plane was transported to Space Center Houston from Ellington Airport on April 30, 2014.

Space Center Houston was briefly considered as a home for one of the retired Space Shuttle orbiters, but the Kennedy Space Center Visitor Complex, Intrepid Sea, Air and Space Museum, and California Science Center were instead selected. A NASA report showing the final scoring showed Space Center Houston finished 10th among 13 museums competing for the three orbiters (not already committed to the Smithsonian Air and Space Museum).

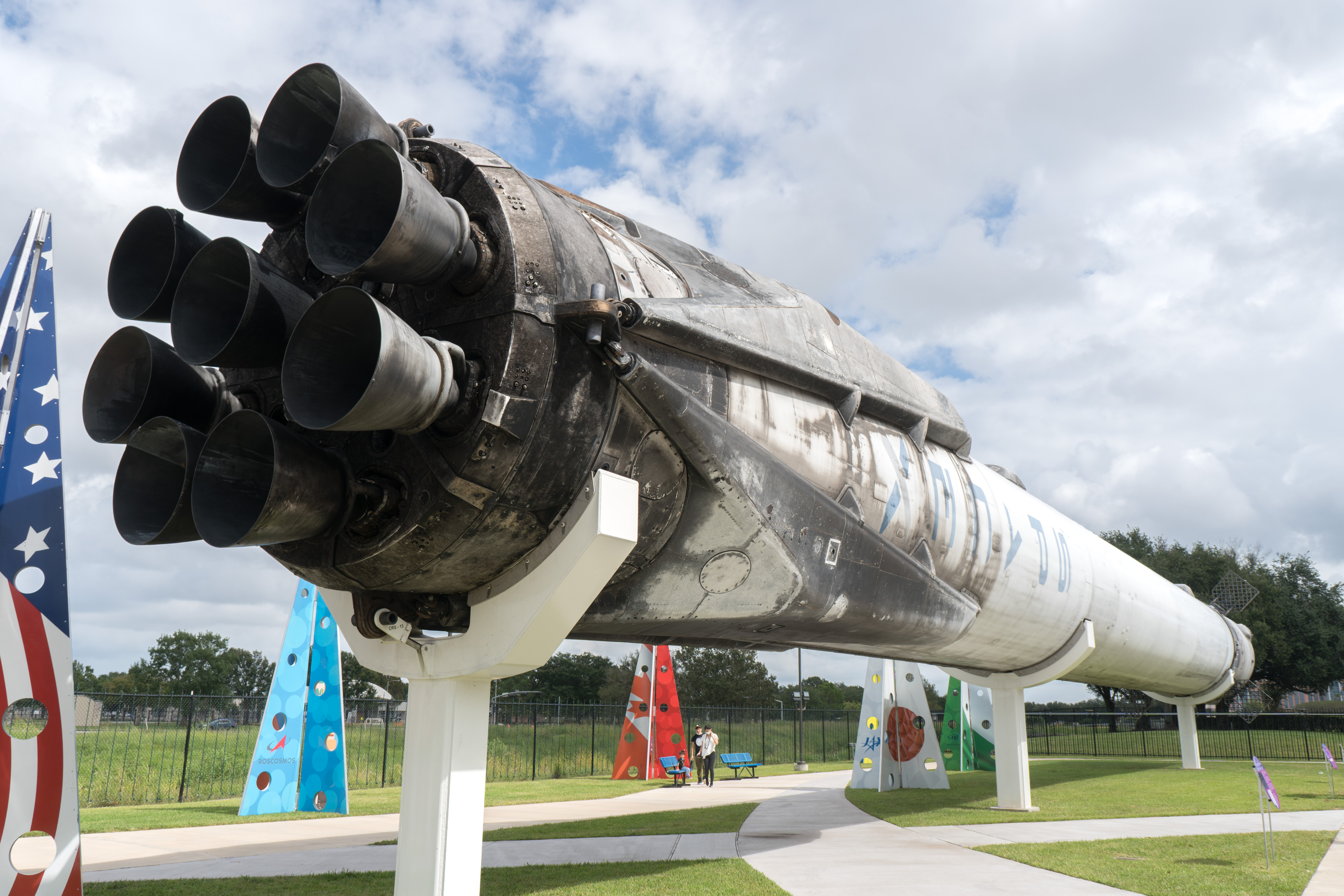
Falcon 9 booster B1035 on display.

A Falcon 9 Full Thrust booster B1035 is displayed near Independence Plaza since March 2020. The booster was used twice in ISS cargo missions CRS-11 and CRS-13 by NASA before retirement.

== Rocket Park ==
Of the three remaining Saturn V rockets on display, only the one at the Johnson Space Center is made up of segments originally intended for flight. The first stage of this Saturn V rocket is from SA-514 (originally intended for the cancelled Apollo 19), the second stage from SA-515 (originally intended for the cancelled Apollo 20), and the third stage from SA-513, which was not needed after it was replaced by the Skylab workshop. SA-513 was originally scheduled for the cancelled Apollo 18 – the rest of the rocket was used for Skylab. The Apollo Command/Service Module CSM-115a (intended for Apollo 19) completes the rocket as it would stand on the launchpad.

The Saturn V, on loan from the Smithsonian, was displayed outside the Johnson Space Center main entrance from 1977 through 2004. Grants from the National Park Service's Save America's Treasures program, the National Trust for Historic Preservation and private contributors funded the restoration by Conservation Solutions of Washington DC with oversight by the Smithsonian.

An open air tram tour takes the general public into the Johnson Space Center with stops including building 30 (location of the Historic Mission Operations Control Room 2 and the Christopher C. Kraft Jr. Mission Control Center), Building 9 (location of the Space Vehicle Mockup Facility) and Rocket Park with a restored Saturn V rocket.

== Mission Mars ==
The exhibit Mission Mars opened in January 2017 (as of July 2026 this exhibit has been replaced) and was developed with the help of NASA. It focuses on the work NASA is doing now to plan for future travel to Mars. Mission Mars teaches visitors about the planet through a variety of activities that transport them to the Martian landscape, including a virtual reality wall, real-time weather forecasts, and a Mars meteorite that guests can touch. Visitors can also see a full-size Orion research capsule, experience an Orion spacecraft simulator, and get a look at the next generation of Mars rovers.

== Other exhibitions and experiences ==
- Tram tours offer guided access to NASA Johnson Space Center's historic Mission Control center, Rocket Park and astronaut training facilities.
- The Astronaut Gallery showcases a comprehensive collection of spacesuits, including Pete Conrad's Apollo 12 moonwalk suit.
- The Space Center Theater is a five-story tall 4K resolution theater that shows EVA 23 and Mission Control: The Unsung Heroes of Apollo.
- The Destiny Theater has a HD digital screen and shows a short historical film, Human Destiny, produced by Bob Rogers and BRC Imagination Arts.
- The live interactive performance Living in Space, produced by Bob Rogers and BRC Imagination Arts, employs projection mapping technology to assist with the live onstage presentation of daily life on the International Space Station.
- The Mission Briefing Center features live presentations offering real-time updates on current NASA missions.
- International Space Station Gallery provides a look inside the space station.
- Talon Park has a pair of NASA T-38 Talon jets greeting visitors at the street entrance to the Space Center Houston campus.

== Education ==
The Manned Space Flight Education Foundation's education department at Space Center Houston is among the nation's leading science-education resources. The programs are based on national science standards and focus on interactive science, technology, and engineering and math (STEM) activities to inspire learning and develop problem-solving and critical-thinking skills for all ages, especially as related to human spaceflight and exploration. Programs include:

- Day camps
- Distance learning
- Field trips
- Girls STEM Academy
- Home School Days
- Overnight experiences
- Scout Camp-Ins
- Sensory Friendly Evenings
- Space Center U
- Space Exploration Educators Conference
- Stars & STEM
- Team building for corporations

== Gallery ==
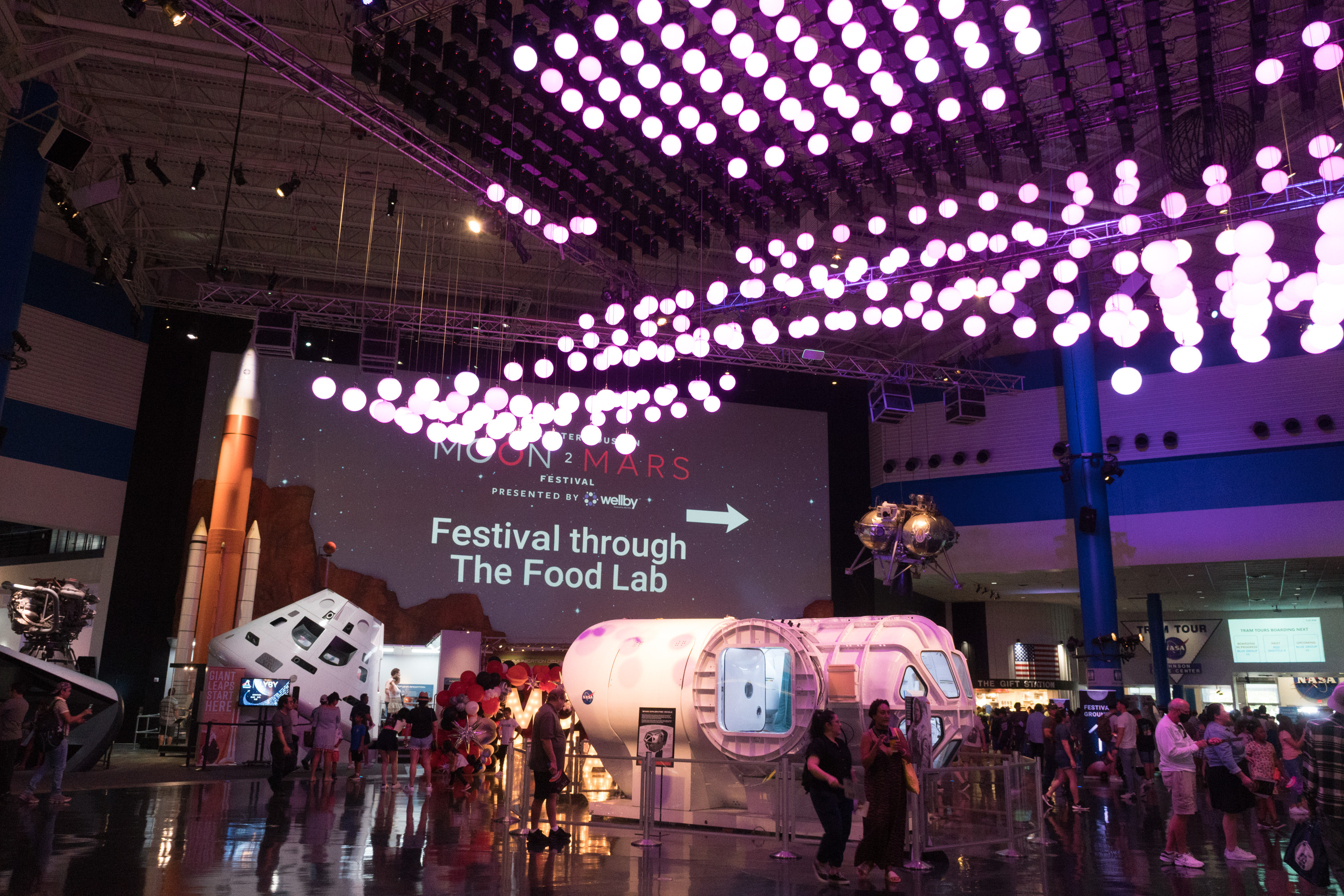
Interior of Space Center Houston

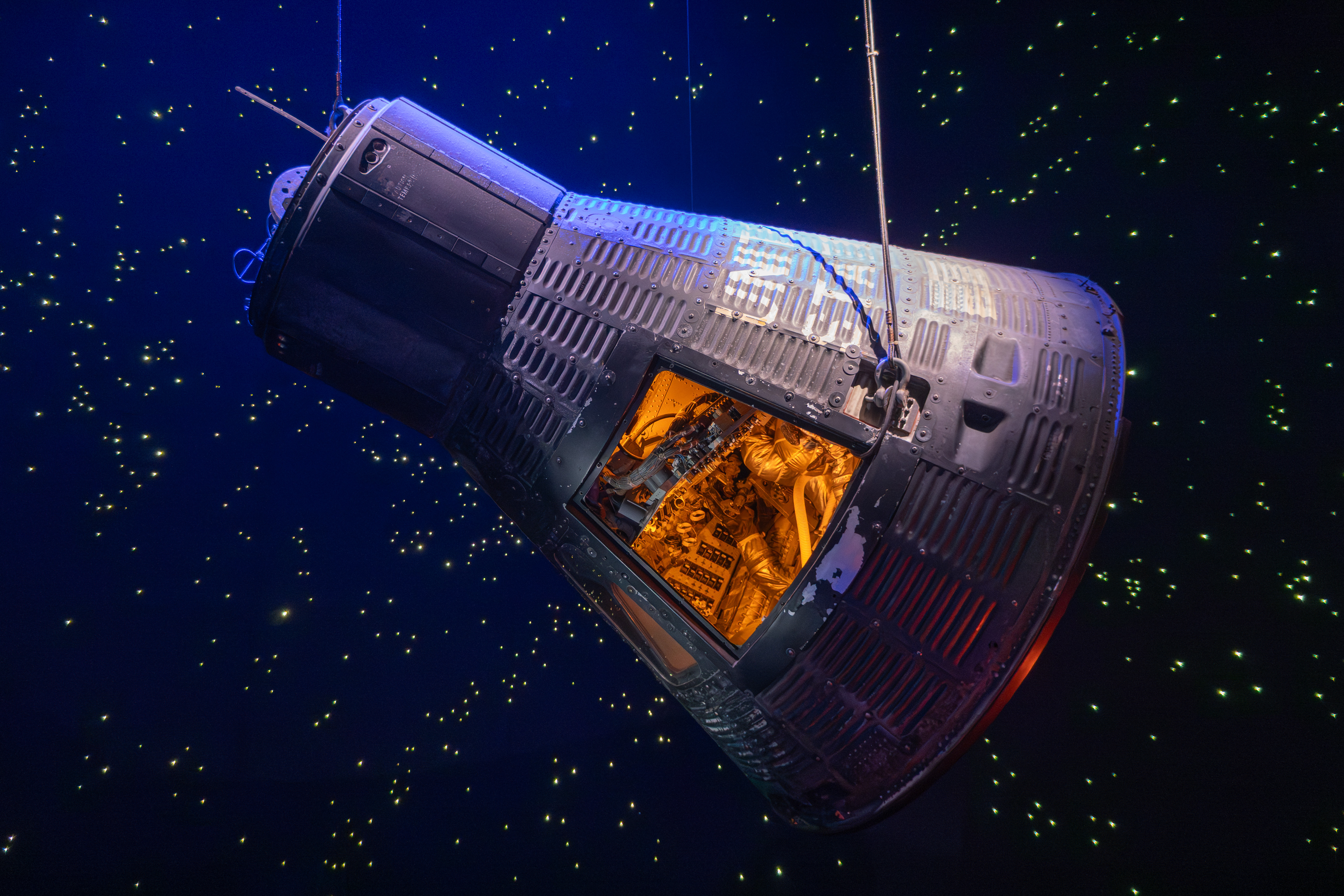
Mercury Faith 7, piloted by Mercury astronaut Gordon Cooper in 1963

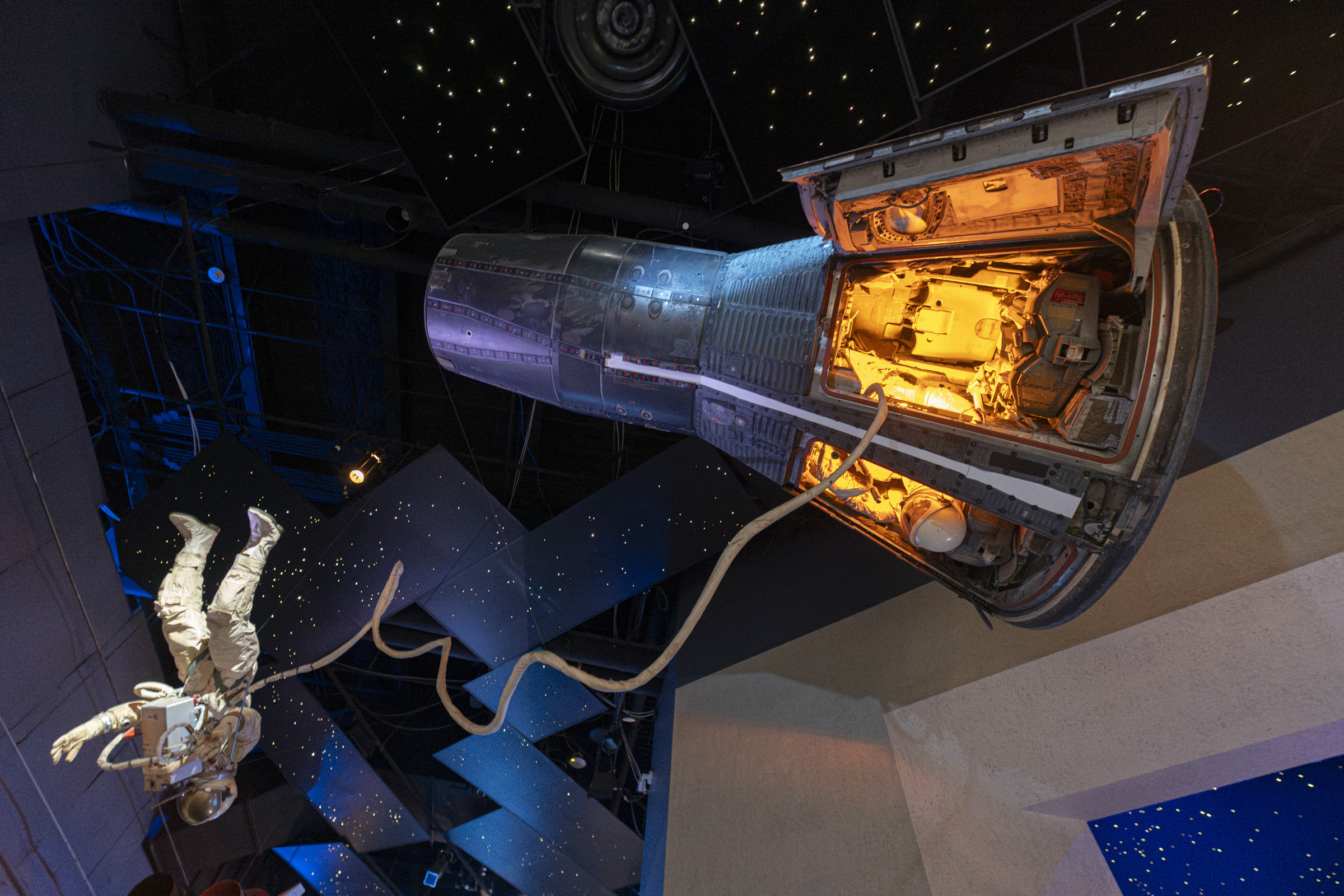
The Gemini 5 space capsule which flew Gordon Cooper and Pete Conrad into low Earth orbit in 1965

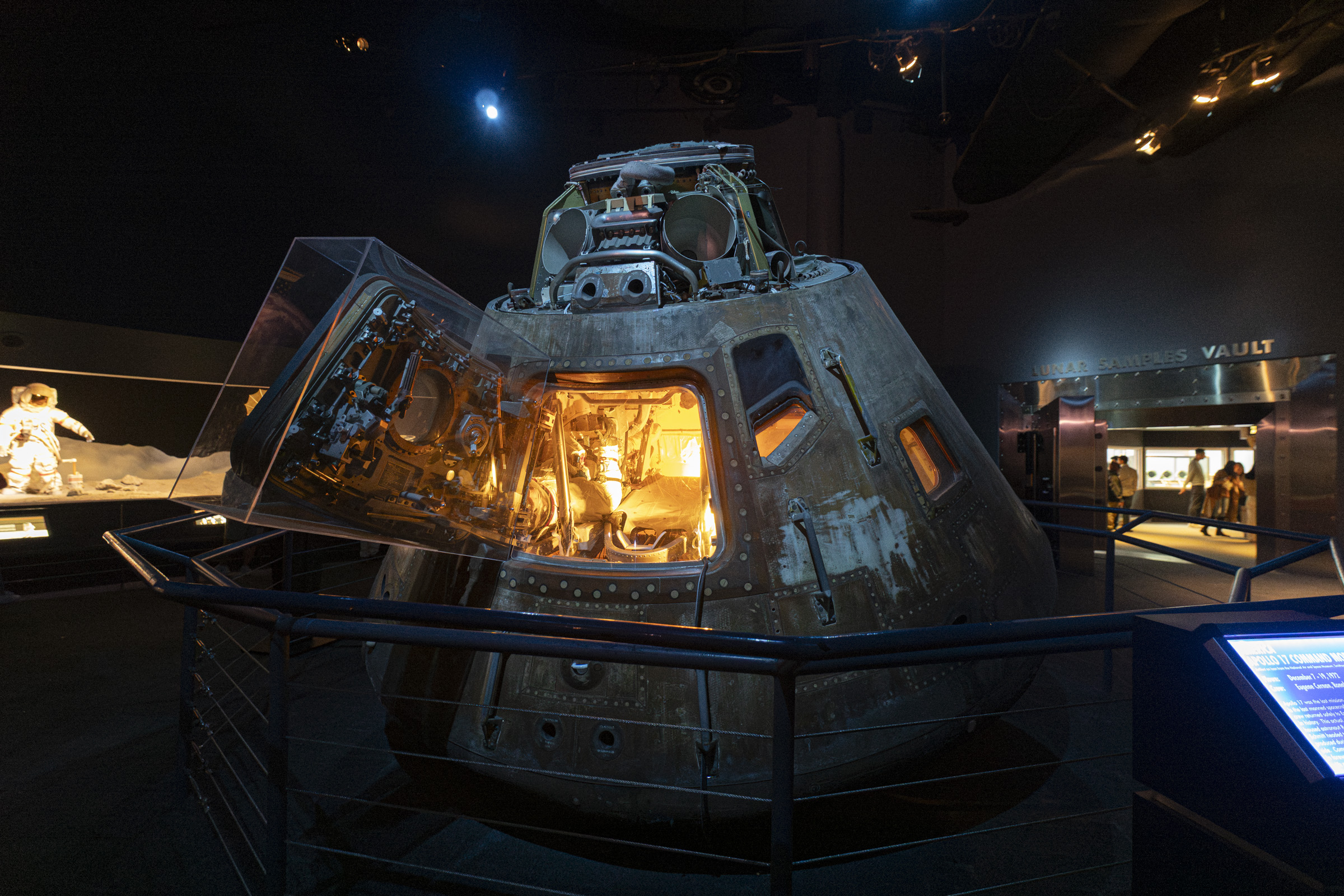
Apollo 17's Command Module America flew Gene Cernan, Ronald Evans, Harrison Schmitt, and five mice to the Moon in NASA's last crewed lunar mission, 1971

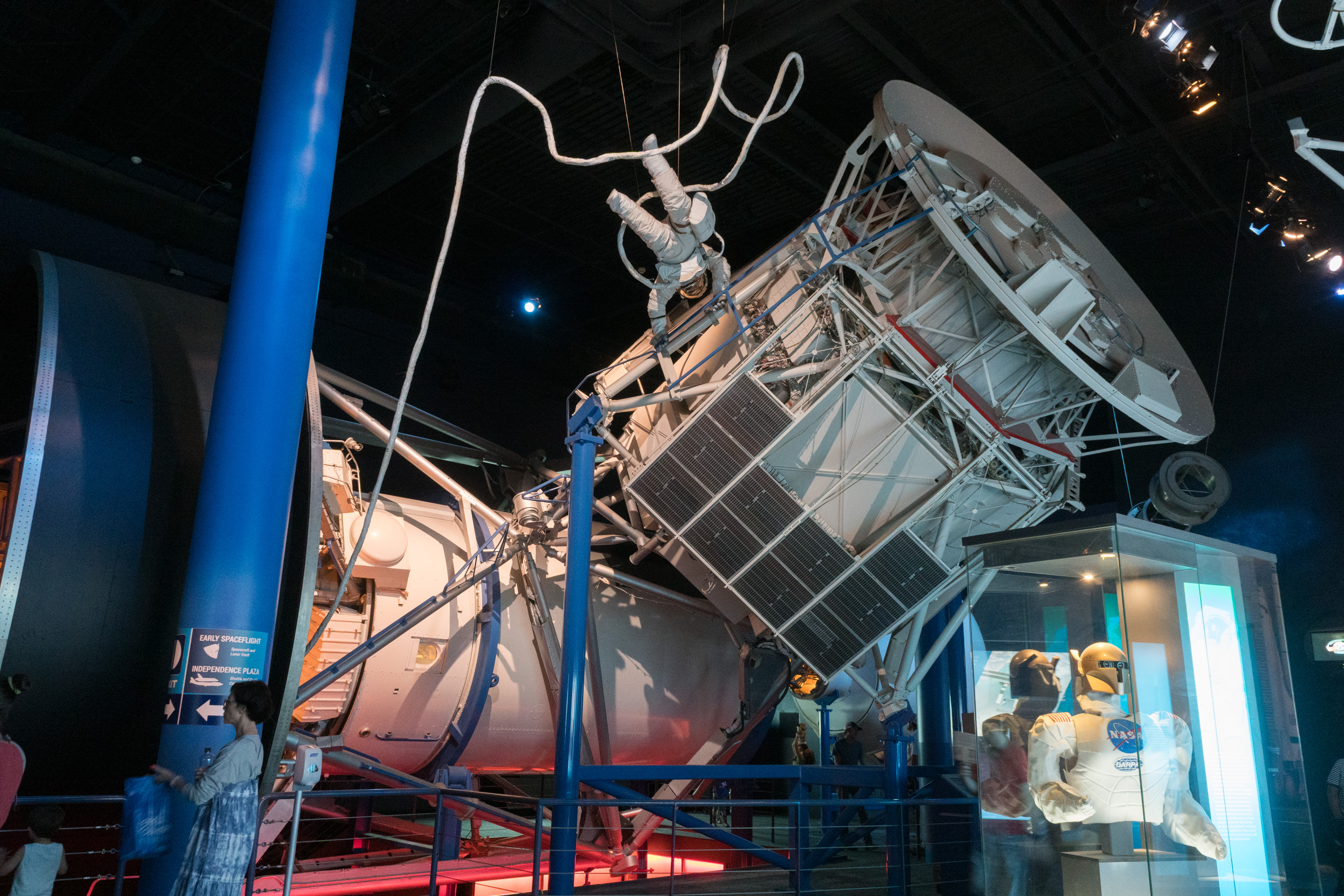
Skylab training model

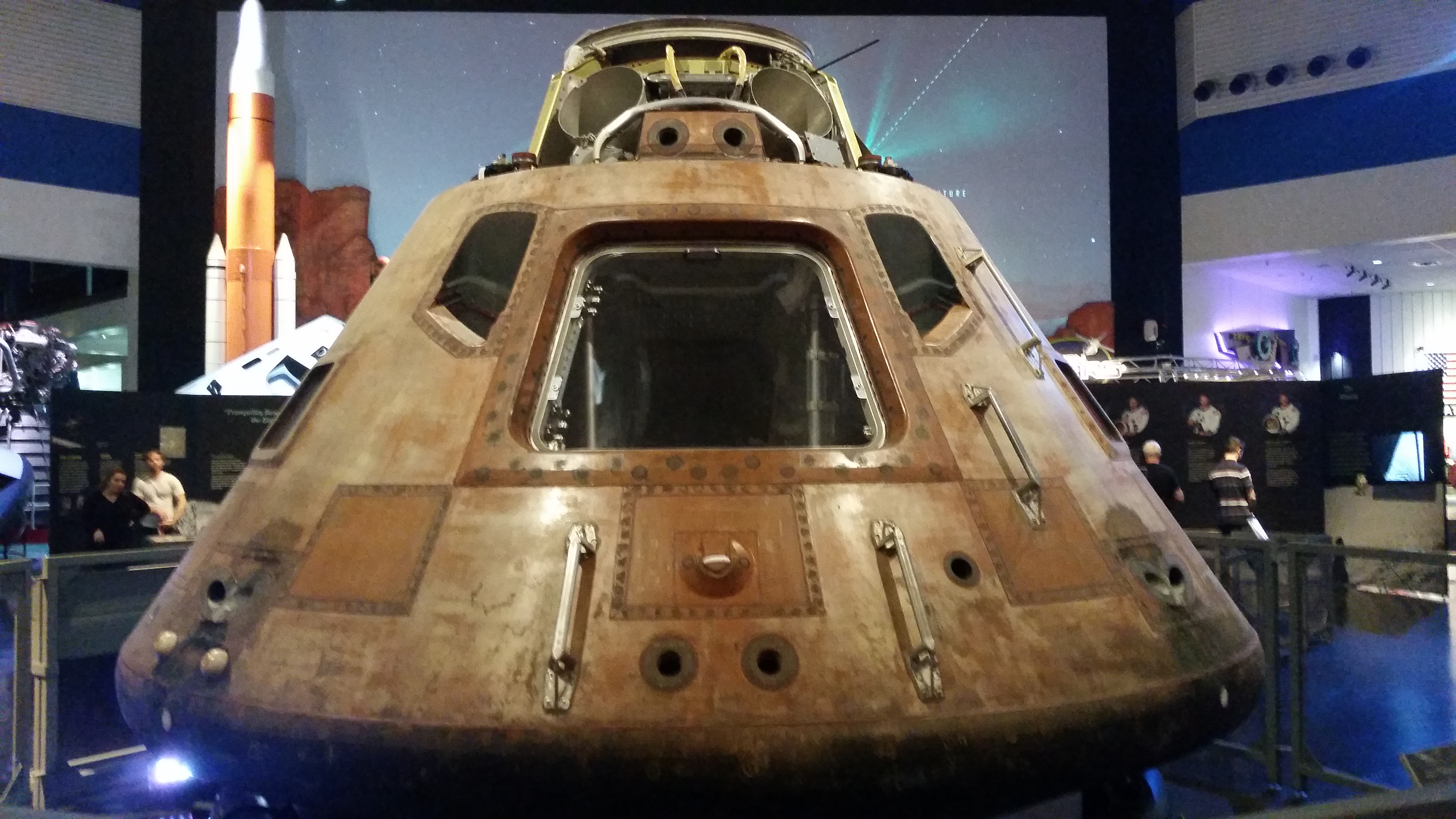
Apollo 11 Command Module Columbia was exhibited at the Space Center in 2017 during a commemorative tour
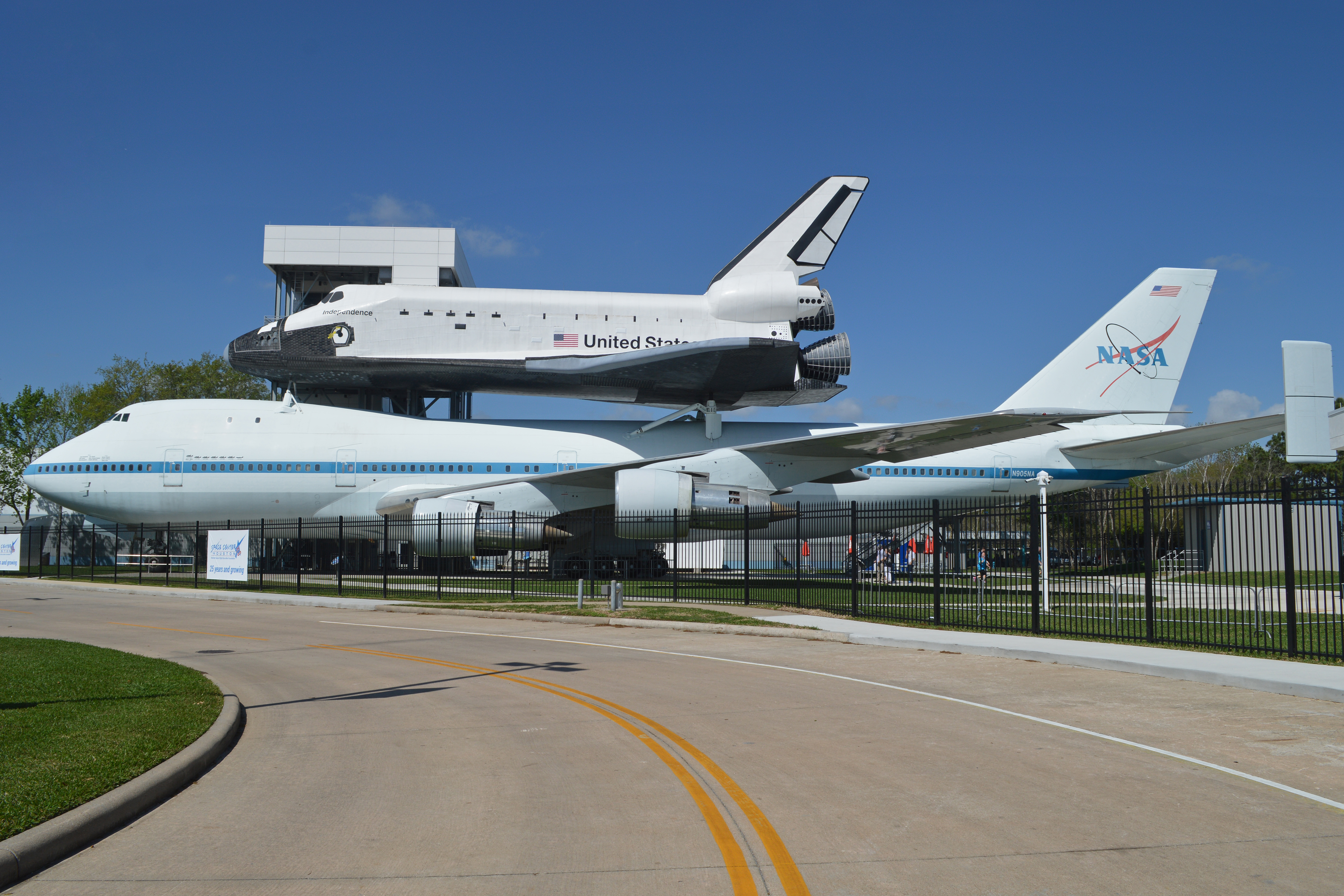
Shuttle Carrier Aircraft ‘N905NA’ with Space Shuttle Orbiter replica

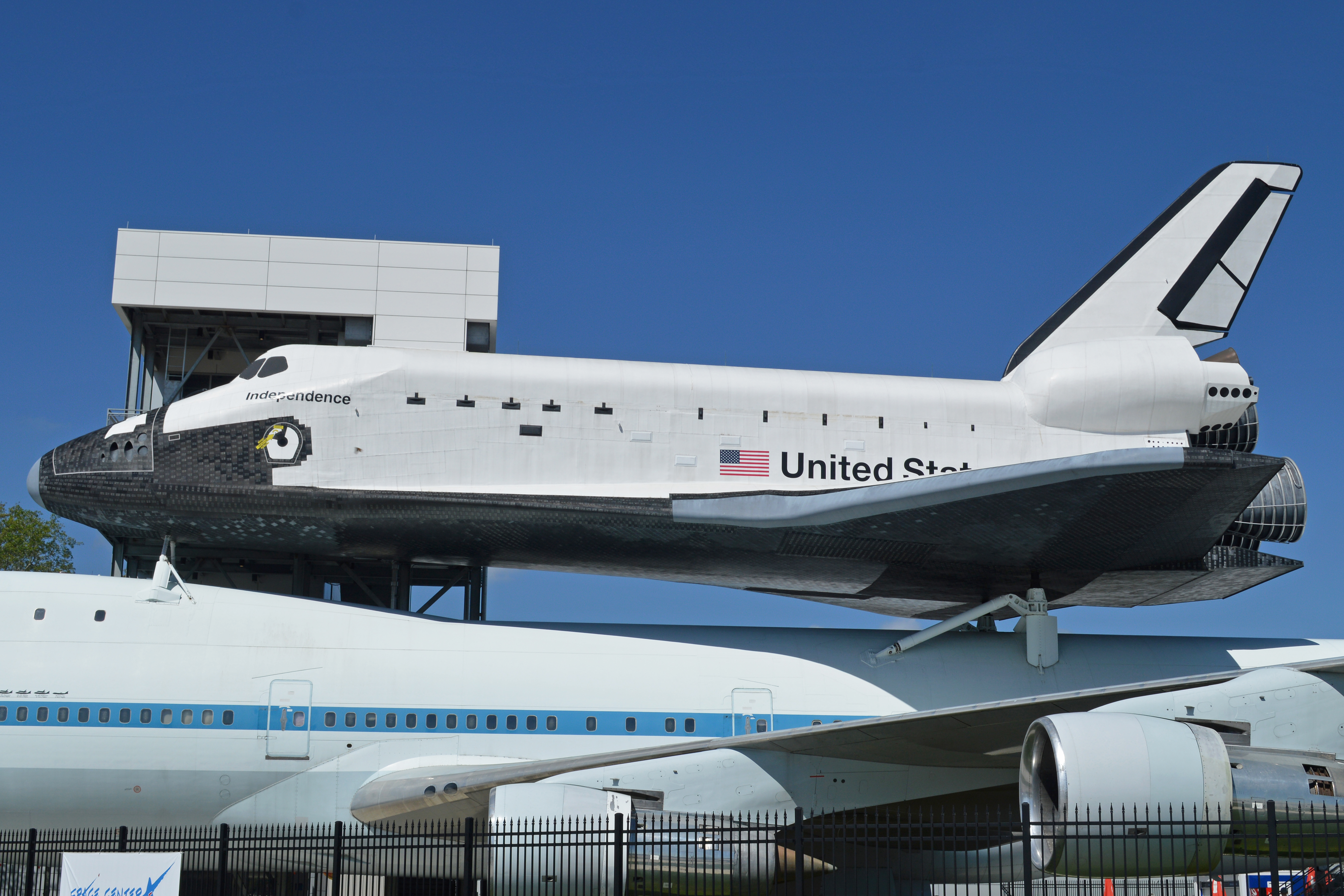
Space Shuttle Orbiter replica “Independence”

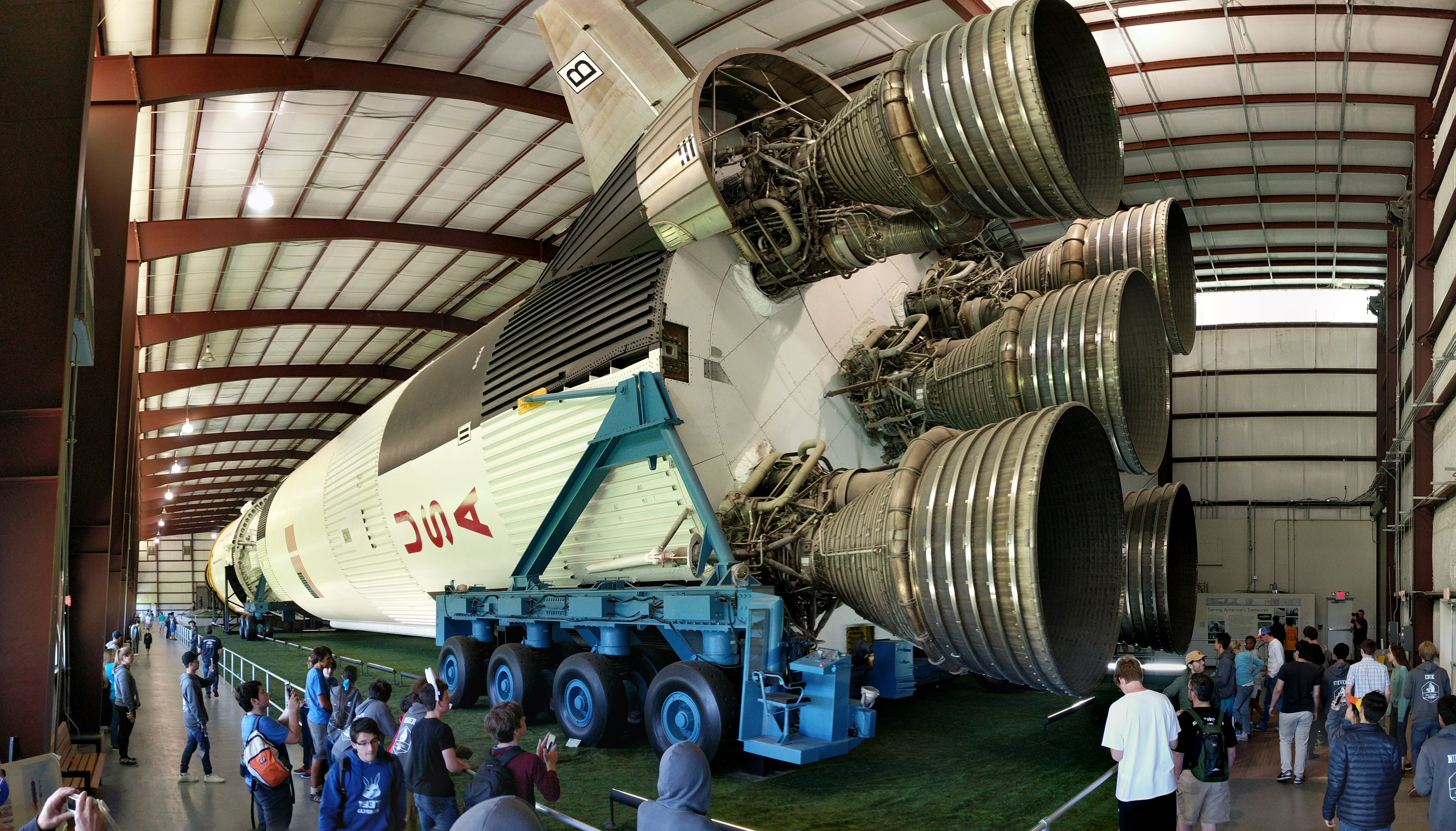
A rear view of the Saturn V on display

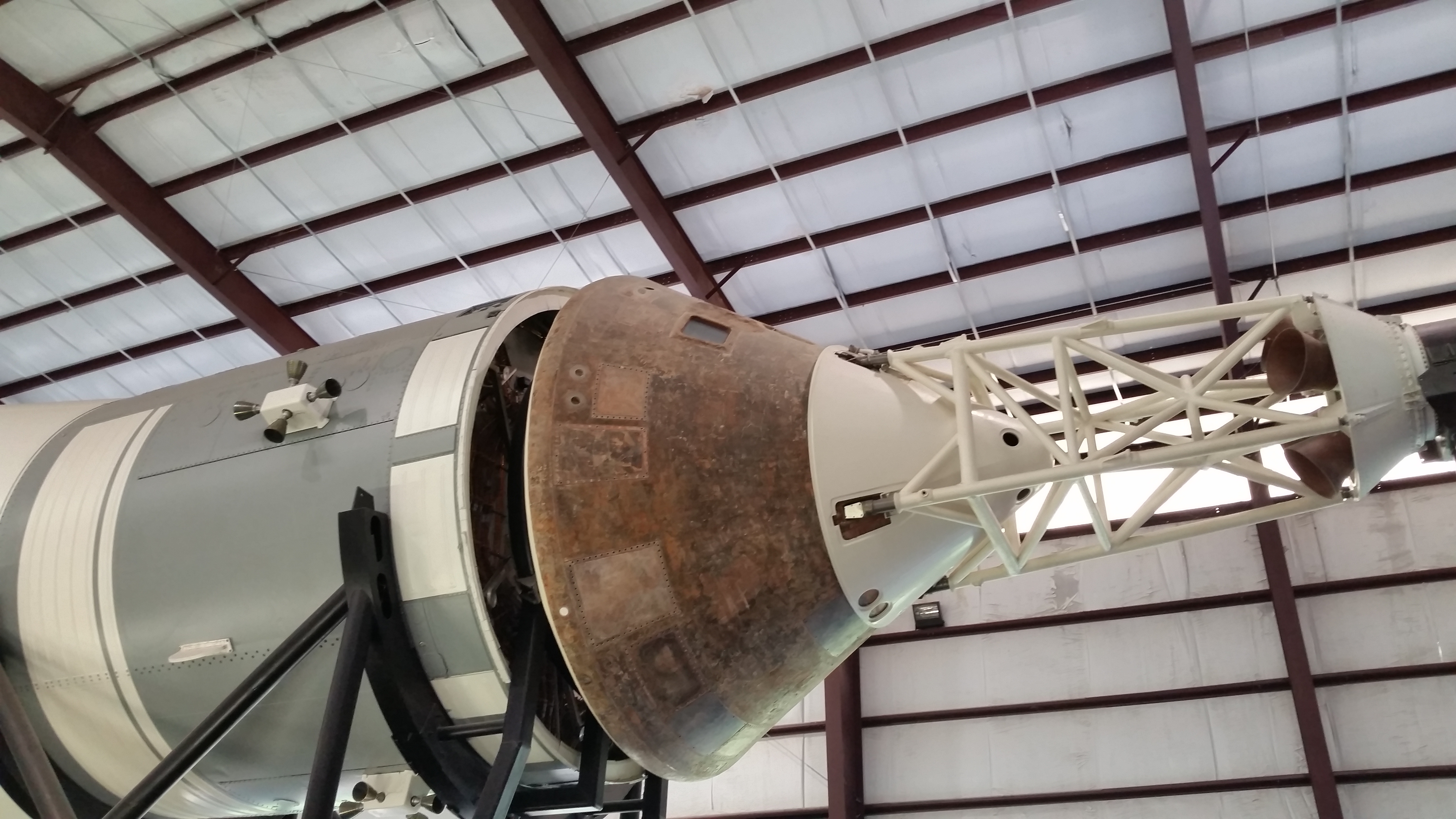
Top of Saturn V

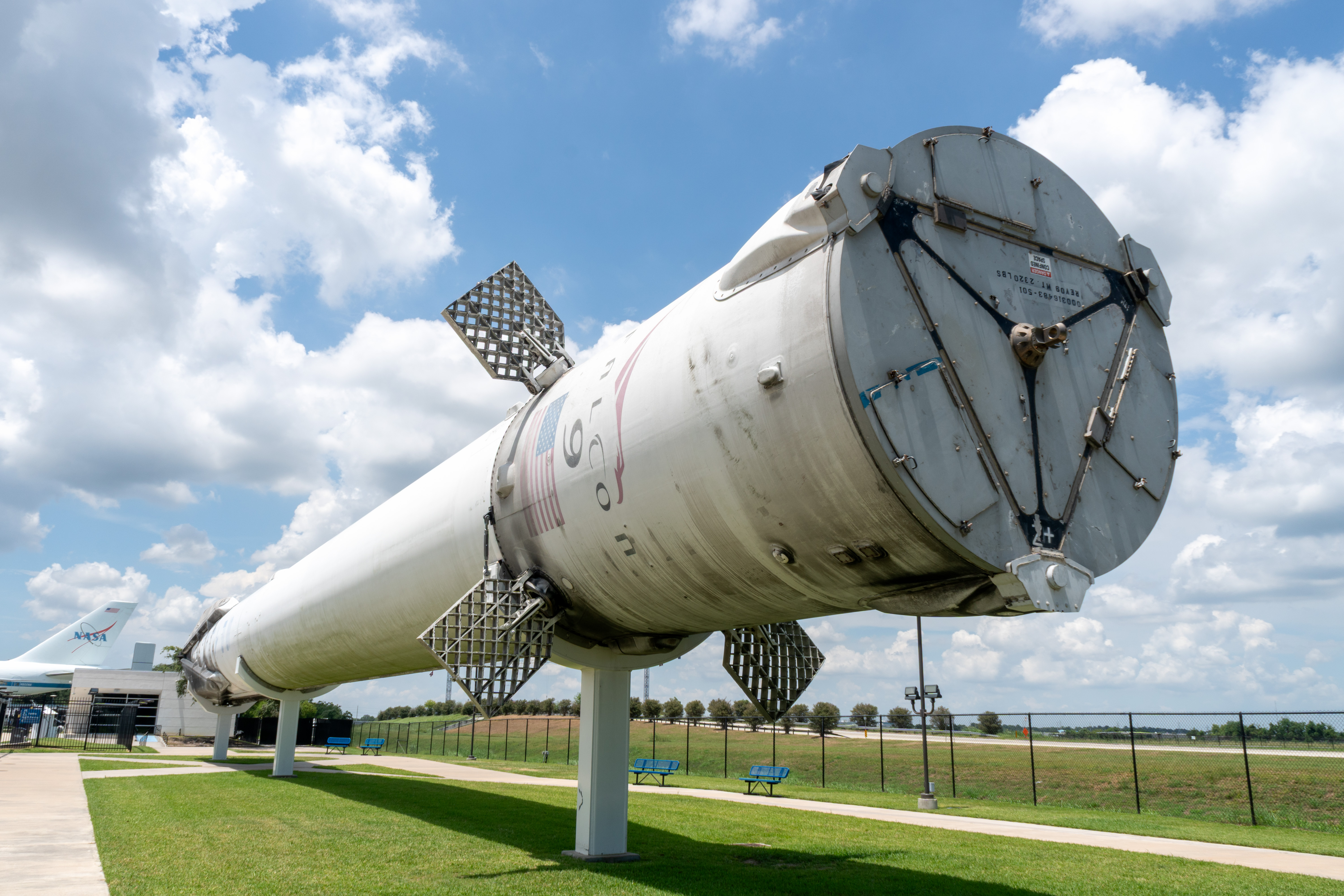
Falcon 9 booster B1035

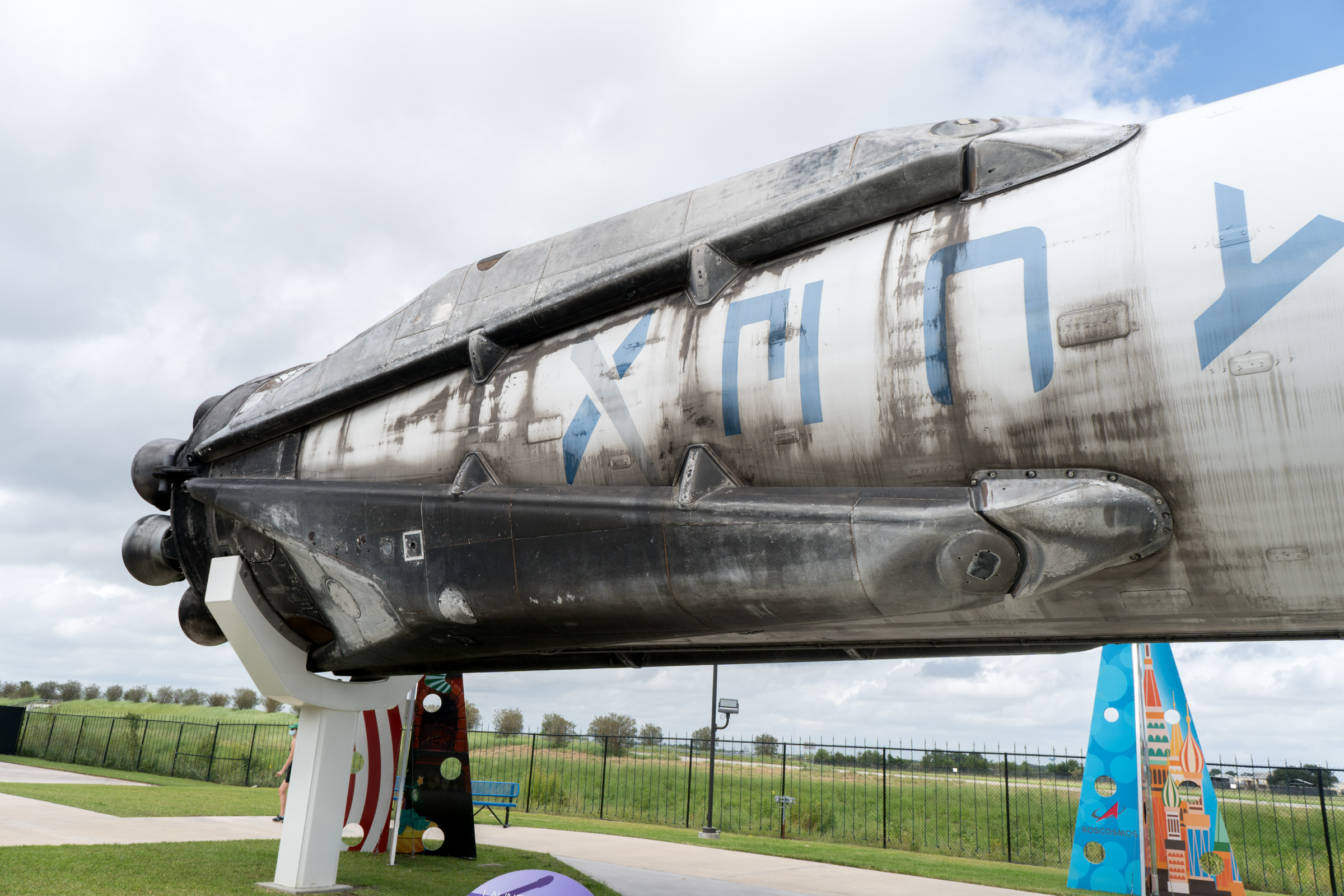
Falcon 9 booster B1035
