= Joe Davies Heritage Airpark =

Aviation museum in Palmdale, California

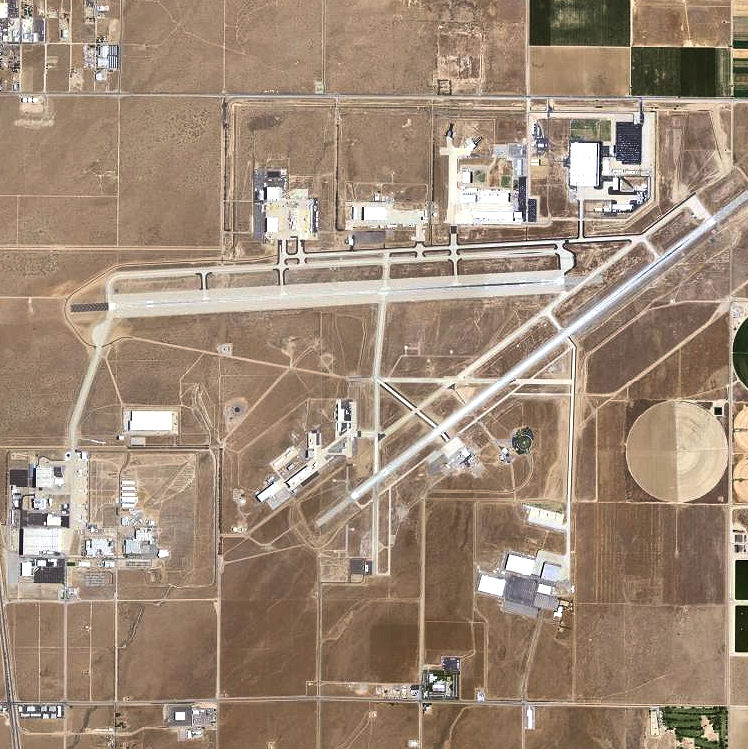
- The Joe Davies Heritage Airpark is located south of U.S. Air Force Plant 42 in the bottom center of the satellite image
- Type: Aviation museum/airpark
- Location: 2001 East Avenue P
- Nearest city: Palmdale, California
- Coordinates: 34°36′8.9″N 118°05′13.6″W
- Area: 26.4 acres (10.7 ha)
- Established: October 20, 1998; 26 years ago
- Owned by: City of Palmdale
- Website: Official website

The Joe Davies Heritage Airpark at Palmdale Plant 42, formerly known as the Palmdale Plant 42 Heritage Airpark is an aviation museum and airpark located in Palmdale, California with various United States military aircraft on display. The park is located adjacent to the United States Air Force Plant 42 and the Blackbird Airpark Museum. All of the aircraft on display were donated or loaned to the city of Palmdale, which owns and operates the park.

== History ==
The Palmdale Plant 42 Heritage Airpark was established on October 20, 1998, by the city of Palmdale and the United States Air Force on land donated to the city of Palmdale by Lockheed Martin Aeronautics. The park is located at 2001 East Avenue P. It is adjacent to United States Air Force Plant 42 to the north and the Blackbird Airpark Museum to the east. The aviation museum was established commemorate the various aircraft which were designed, built, and flown at Plant 42.

In 2008, park was renamed to the Joe Davies Heritage Airpark at Palmdale Plant 42 to honor Joe Davies, a resident of Palmdale who served as the commander of Plant 42 from 1963 to 1967 and later served three terms on the Palmdale city council from 1988 to 1996. A memorial plaque was installed at the park in 2021. The park has a program called "Adopt-a-Plane" which cleans aircraft on a bi-weekly or monthly basis. Admission and parking are free, and the park is open to the public on Fridays, Saturdays, and Sundays. Most of its employees are volunteers.

== Aircraft on display ==
The aviation museum has a total of 21 retired military aircraft and a 1:8 scale model on display.

The first aircraft to be put on display at the park was a North American F-100 Super Sabre (Bureau number: 54–2299). On September 12, 2014, one of the two Boeing 747 Shuttle Carrier Aircraft (Tail number: N911NA) was put on display at the park as a part of a long-term loan from NASA to the city of Palmdale. According to the city of Palmdale, the Joe Davies Heritage Airpark could display a Boeing 767, a Convair F-102 Delta Dagger, a Lockheed F-117 Nighthawk, a Lockheed Martin F-22 Raptor, a Lockheed Martin F-35 Lightning II, a Northrop Grumman B-2 Spirit, (Note: The current Northrop Grumman B-2 Spirit on display at the park is a 1:8 scale-model.) and a Rockwell-MBB X-31 in the future. The park plans to have over 40 aircraft on display. In addition to the aircraft on display, the aviation museum also uses various salvaged aircraft parts as decoration elements. All of the aircraft displayed by the park were donated or loaned to the city of Palmdale.

The following table lists all the aircraft on display.

| # | Image | Aircraft | Donated to the park | Put on display |
|---|---|---|---|---|
| 1 | | Northrop Grumman B-2 Spirit (1:8 scale-model) | — | — |
| 2 | | Curtiss C-46D Commando; Serial number: 44-78019-A | | |
| 3 | | McDonnell F-101F Voodoo; Serial number: 58-0324 | May 2005 | November 2006 |
| 4 | | North American F-100D Super Sabre; Serial number: 54-2299 | 1 August 1998 | 1 October 1998 |
| 5 | | Lockheed F-104C Starfighter; Serial number: 57-0915 | October 1998 | October 1998 |
| 6 | | Republic F-105F Thunderchief; Serial number: 62-4416 | August 1998 | October 1998 |
| 7 | | Grumman F-14D Tomcat; Bureau Number: 164350 | October 2006 | December 2006 |
| 8 | | General Dynamics F-16 Fighting Falcon (Note: Forward part of F-16C 84-1228 and rear of F-16B 78-0105.); Serial number: 78-0105 | | |
| 9 | | AGM-28 Hound Dog #M-025 | 26 June 2007 | 26 June 2007 |
| 10 | | Boeing B-52F Stratofortress; Serial number: 57-0038 | | |
| 11 | | Boeing 747 Shuttle Carrier Aircraft; Aircraft registration: N911NA | 12 September 2014 | 12 September 2014 |
| 12 | | Scaled Composites Triumph; Aircraft registration: N143SC | May 2006 | March 2007 |
| 13 | | Lockheed T-33A; Serial number: 51-4533 | April 2007 | 7 February 2008 |
| 14 | | Lockheed Martin X-55; Serial number: S0303A-0963 | | |
| 15 | | LTV A-7B Corsair II; Bureau Number: 154449 | | |
| 16 | | McDonnell F-4D Phantom II; Serial number: 65-0696 | | |
| 17 | | Northrop T-38A Talon; Serial number: 63-8182 | 1 August 1998 | 1 October 1998 |
| 18 | | Douglas A-4C Skyhawk; Bureau Number: 145067 | March 2001 | August 2004 |
| 19 | | Northrop F-5E Tiger II; Serial number: 74-1529 | May 2005 | October 2005 |
| 20 | | Lockheed JetStar; Aircraft registration: N814NA | January 2003 | May 2005 |
| 21 | | Canadair Sabre CL-13 Mk.5; Serial number: RCAF23231; Aircraft registration: N91FS | August 1998 | October 1998 |
| 22 | | Space Shuttle Evacuation Test Sled | | |

== See also ==
- List of aviation museums
