= Guard-Lee =

Full-size/high-fidelity spacecraft replica manufacturer and spacecraft repair company

- Company type: Private
- Industry: Custom fabrication
- Founded: 1982; 43 years ago in Apopka, Florida, United States
- Founder: Edward Guard
- Headquarters: Apopka, Florida, United States
- Key people: Tom Wilkes (President)
- Website: guard-lee.com

Guard-Lee Inc is an Apopka, Florida based manufacturer of full size, high fidelity aerospace replicas including aircraft, spacecraft, rockets, and space suits. The company also restores historic spacecraft and rockets. The company has created scale models of aircraft, rockets and space craft for numerous NASA centers including nearby Kennedy Space Center, the Smithsonian Institution, Walt Disney World and Universal Studios and the US Air Force.

In 2006, the company prepared the forward fuselage of a 747 donated by Northwest Airlines to the National Air and Space Museum at the Charlotte Aircraft Corporation facility at the Laurinburg-Maxton Airport in Maxton, NC.

The company is listed among NASA's supplier of scale models of spacecraft and aircraft.
