= Laurinburg–Maxton Airport =

Airport in North Carolina, United States of America

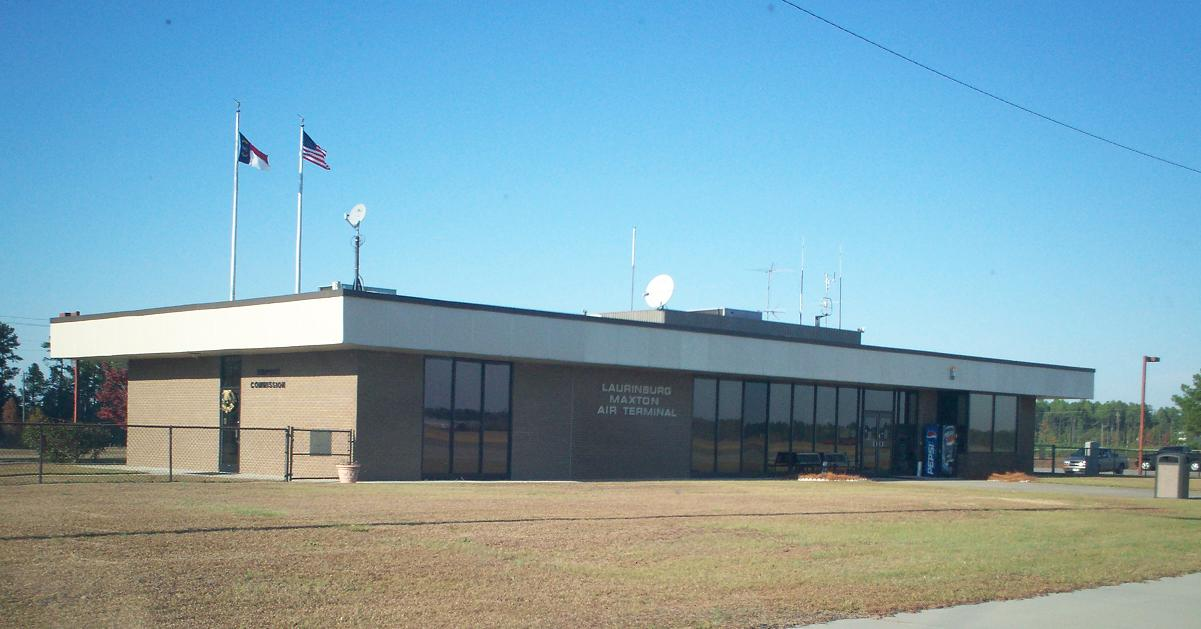
- IATA: MXE; ICAO: KMEB; FAA LID: MEB

Summary
- Airport type: Public
- Owner: Southeast Regional Airport Authority
- Serves: Maxton, North Carolina
- Location: Stewartsville Township, Scotland County
- Elevation AMSL: 220 ft / 67.1 m
- Coordinates: 34°47′31″N 079°21′57″W
- Interactive map of Laurinburg–Maxton Airport

Runways
Direction	Length		Surface
Direction	ft	m	Surface
5/23	6,489	1,978	Concrete
13/31	3,753	1,144	Concrete

Laurinburg–Maxton Airport (IATA: MXE, ICAO: KMEB, FAA LID: MEB) is a public use airport located three miles (5 km) north of the central business district of Maxton and east of Laurinburg. Maxton is located primarily in Robeson County, North Carolina, USA while Laurinburg is in Scotland County, North Carolina, USA as is the airport proper. This general aviation airport covers 4,290 acres (1,736 ha) and has two runways. It is home of the United States Army Parachute team Golden Knights.

Although most U.S. airports use the same three-letter location identifier for the FAA and IATA, Laurinburg–Maxton Airport is assigned MEB by the FAA and MXE by the IATA (which assigned MEB to Essendon Airport in Melbourne, Victoria, Australia). The airport's ICAO identifier is KMEB.

The airfield was constructed for the United States Army Air Force during World War II. During the war the airfield was a large training base for glider-towing aircraft.

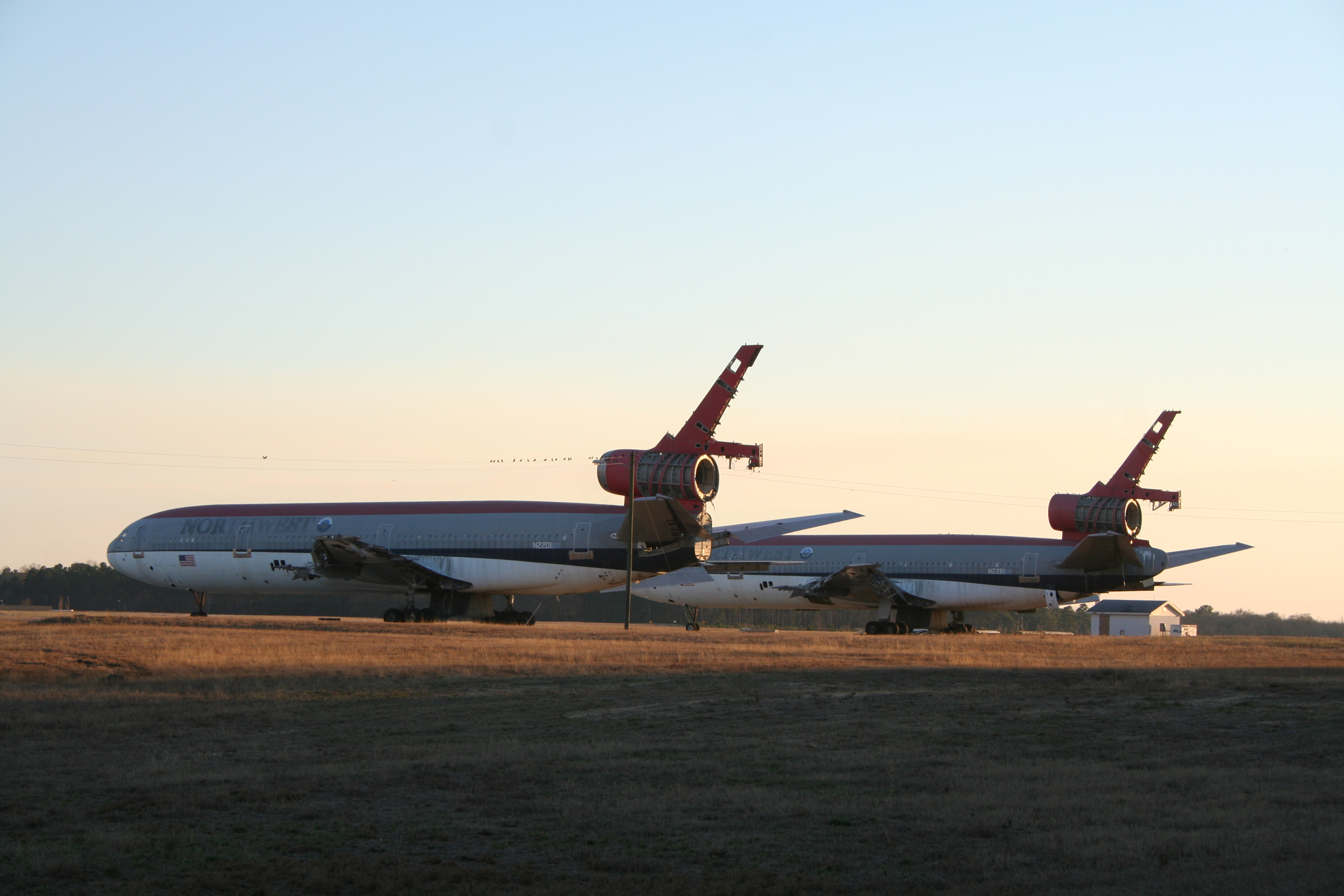
Northwest Airlines DC-10 aircraft awaiting dismantling

Today the airfield is noted for being the home of Charlotte Aircraft, a company which parts-out and scraps older aircraft. Visitors to the airfield can see a number of 727s, DC-10s, 737s, and 747s in various stages of being dismantled and scrapped.

In 2006 the forward fuselage of Northwest Airlines' first 747-100 was removed from the aircraft at Maxton by Guard-Lee for installation in the National Air and Space Museum on the National Mall in Washington DC. The remainder of the aircraft was scrapped and parted by Charlotte Aircraft at Laurinburg–Maxton Airport. This was replaced with N603US, which was the third Northwest Airlines 747-100.

In 1994 the East Coast Timing Association (ECTA) began land speed racing at what became known as the "Maxton Mile". The ECTA was formed by two Bonneville racers, Tom Sarda and John Beckett, with the idea of providing its members with a place to run speed trials in the eastern half of the United States. It had a mostly concrete surface with greater traction than the slick salt of Bonneville, and it produced similar speeds to the SCTA sanctioned El Mirage. The longest runway at Maxton sat unused since the 1960s and was badly overgrown. Volunteers with the ECTA removed hundreds of truckloads of debris to reveal 1.6 miles of concrete. The ECTA held its first time trials at Maxton in 1994 and for 14 years constantly improved the runway, eventually repaving almost 40% of the mile. ECTA lost their lease on the property in 2010 after 14 years. The airport authority had leased half of the runway to the Gryphon Group, a para-military anti-terrorist training center. The two groups could not co-exist at the airport, although the ECTA only held 5 weekend events a year.

== See also ==
- List of airports in North Carolina
