= United States Astronaut Hall of Fame =

Facility at Kennedy Space Center honoring American astronauts

Coordinates: 28.522840°N 80.683022°W

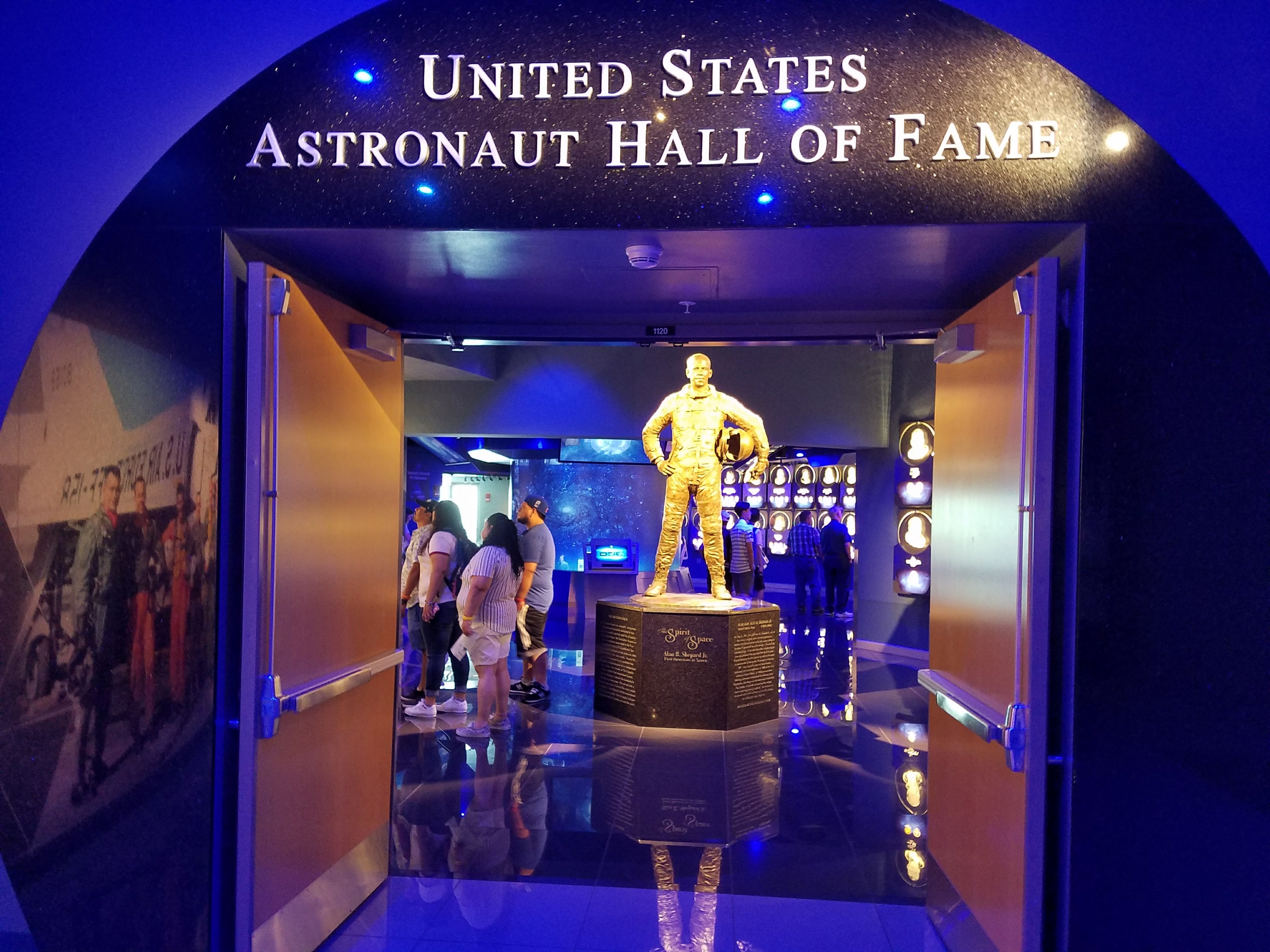
Statue of Alan Shepard, the first American in space and the fifth person to walk on the Moon, located at the entrance

The United States Astronaut Hall of Fame, located inside the Kennedy Space Center Visitor Complex Heroes & Legends building on Merritt Island, Florida, honors American astronauts and features the world's largest collection of their personal memorabilia, focusing on those astronauts who have been inducted into the Hall. Exhibits include Wally Schirra's Sigma 7 space capsule from the fifth crewed Mercury mission and the Gemini IX spacecraft flown by Gene Cernan and Thomas P. Stafford in 1966.

== History ==
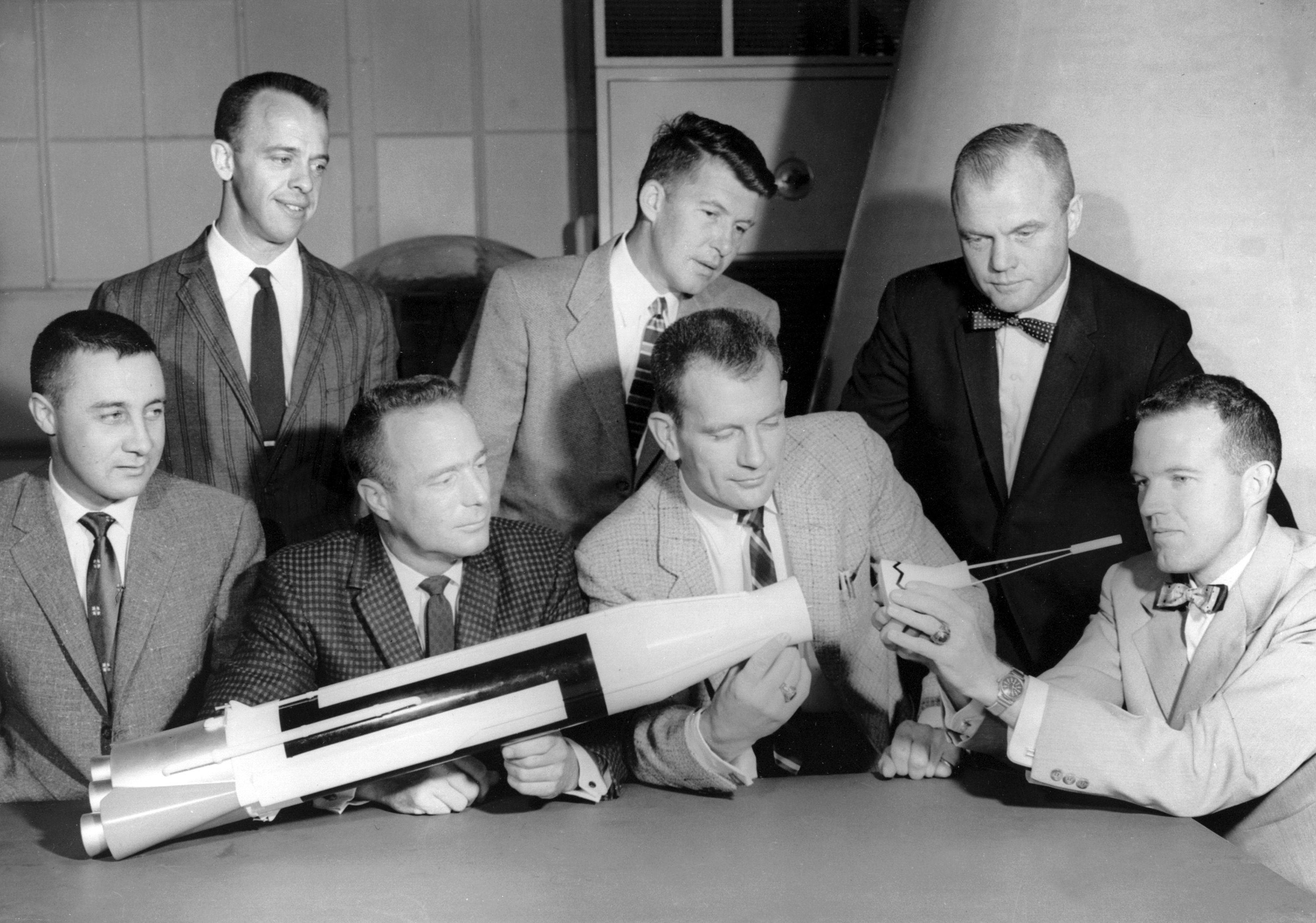
The Mercury astronauts in 1962, inducted 1990

In the 1980s, the six then-surviving Mercury Seven astronauts conceived of establishing a place where US space travelers could be remembered and honored, along the lines of halls of fame for other fields. The Mercury Seven Foundation and Astronaut Scholarship Foundation were formed, and have a role in the ongoing operations of the Hall of Fame. The foundation's first executive director was former Associated Press space reporter Howard Benedict.

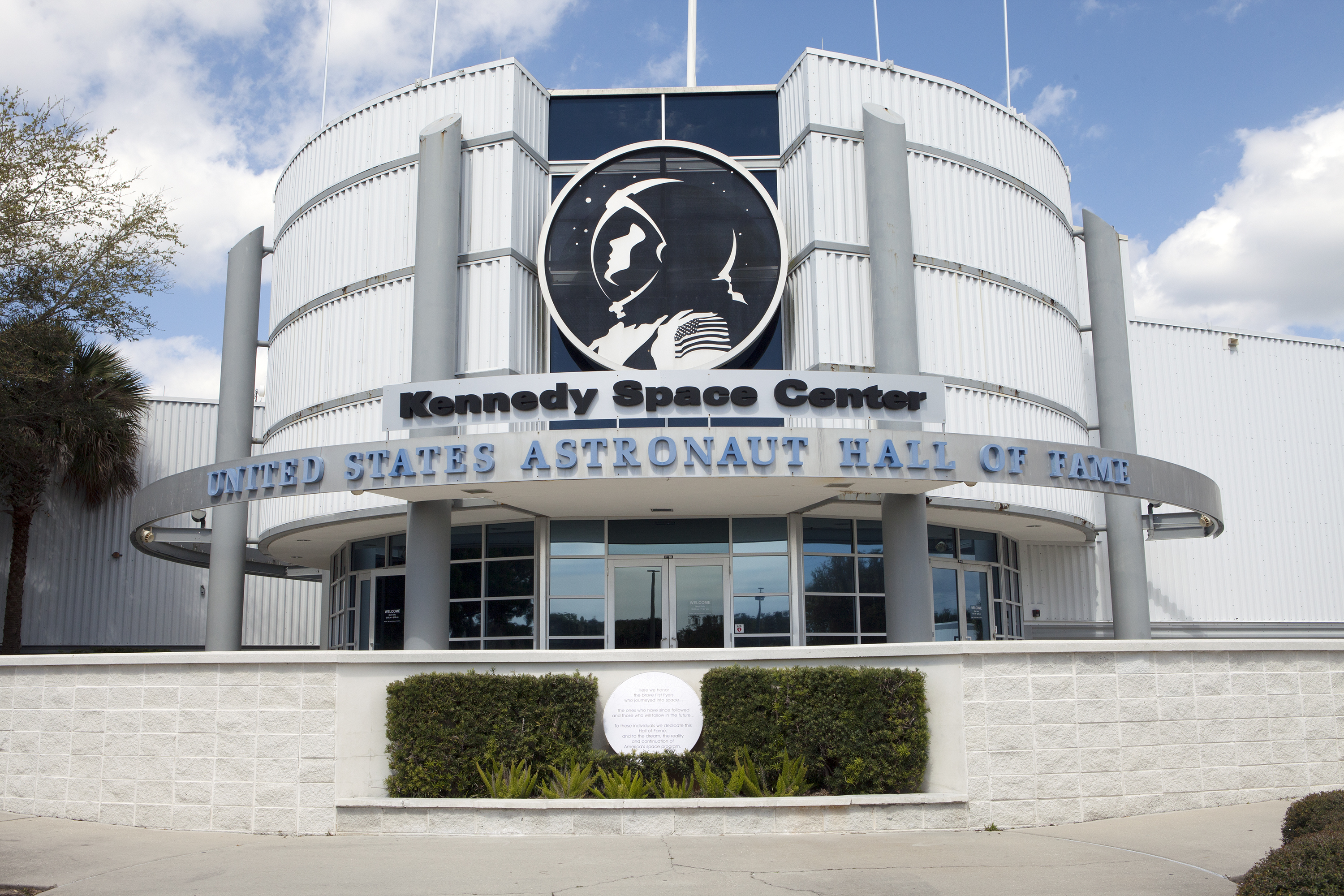
Entrance to the original Astronaut Hall of Fame

The Astronaut Hall of Fame was opened on October 29, 1990, by the U.S. Space Camp Foundation, which was the first owner of the facility. It was located next to the Florida branch of Space Camp.

The Hall of Fame closed for several months in 2002 when U.S. Space Camp Foundation's creditors foreclosed on the property due to low attendance and mounting debt. That September, an auction was held and the property was purchased by Delaware North Park Services on behalf of NASA and the property was added to the Kennedy Space Center Visitor Complex. The Hall of Fame re-opened December 14, 2002.

The Hall of Fame, which was originally located just west of the NASA Causeway, closed to the public on November 2, 2015, in preparation for its relocation to the Kennedy Space Center Visitor Complex 6 miles (9.7 km) to the east on Merritt Island. Outside of the original building was a full-scale replica of a Space Shuttle orbiter named Inspiration (originally named "Shuttle To Tomorrow" where visitors could enter and view a program). Inspiration served only as an outdoor, full scale, static display which visitors could not enter. After the Hall of Fame was transferred to the KSC Visitor Complex, Inspiration was acquired by LVX System and was placed in storage at the Shuttle Landing Facility at the Kennedy Space Center; in 2016, the shuttle was loaded on to a barge to be taken for refurbishment before going on an educational tour.

The building was purchased at auction by visitor complex operator Delaware North and renamed the ATX Center, and for a time housed educational programs including Camp Kennedy Space Center and the Astronaut Training Experience. Those programs have since been moved to the KSC Visitor Complex, and as of December 2019, the structure was being offered for lease. In July 2020, Lockheed Martin announced it would lease the building to support work on the NASA Orion crew capsule.

== Inductees ==
Inductees into the Hall of Fame are selected by a blue ribbon committee of former NASA officials and flight controllers, historians, journalists, and other space authorities (including former astronauts) based on their accomplishments in space or their contributions to the advancement of space exploration. Except for 2002, inductions have been held every year since 2001.

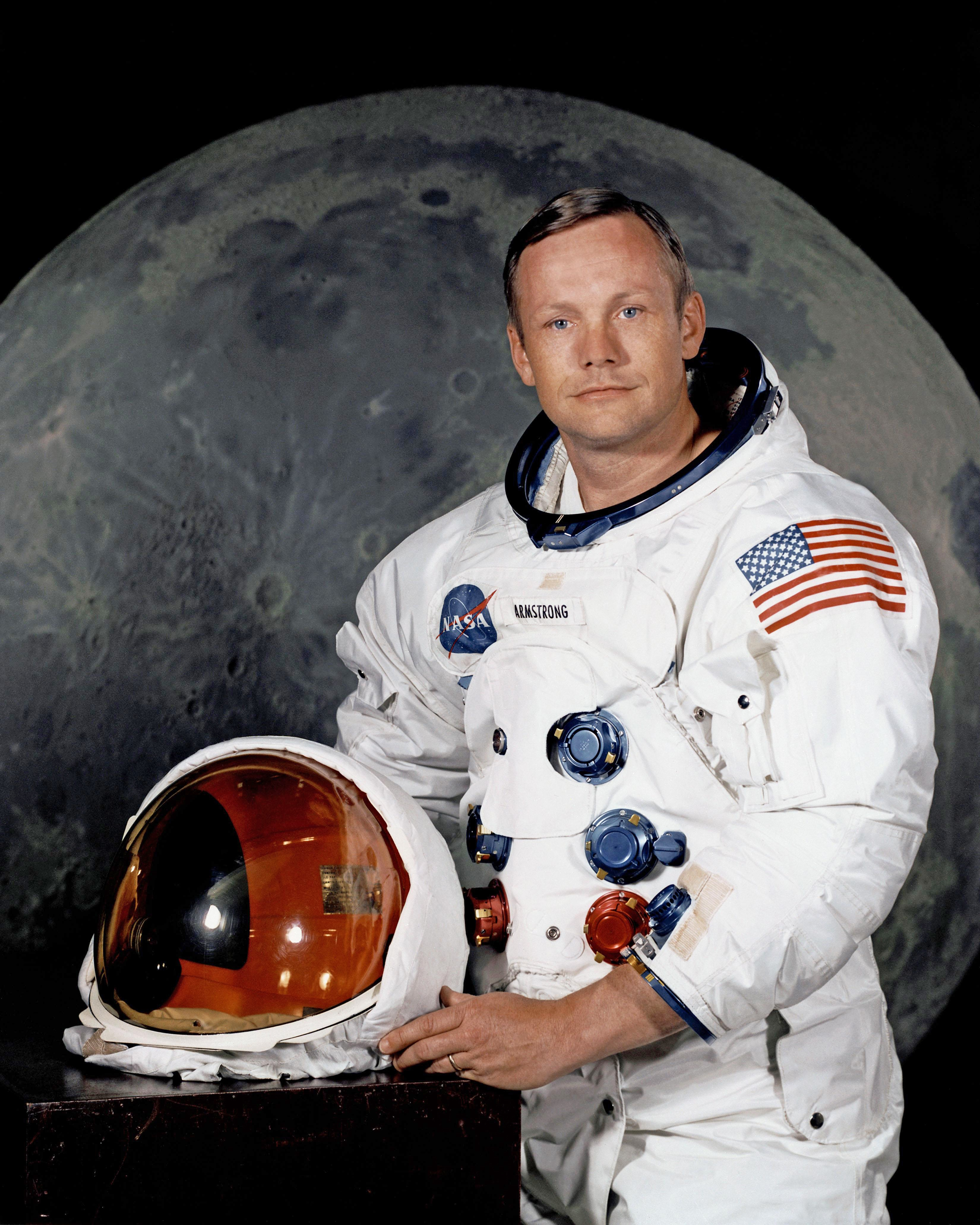
Neil Armstrong, inducted 1993

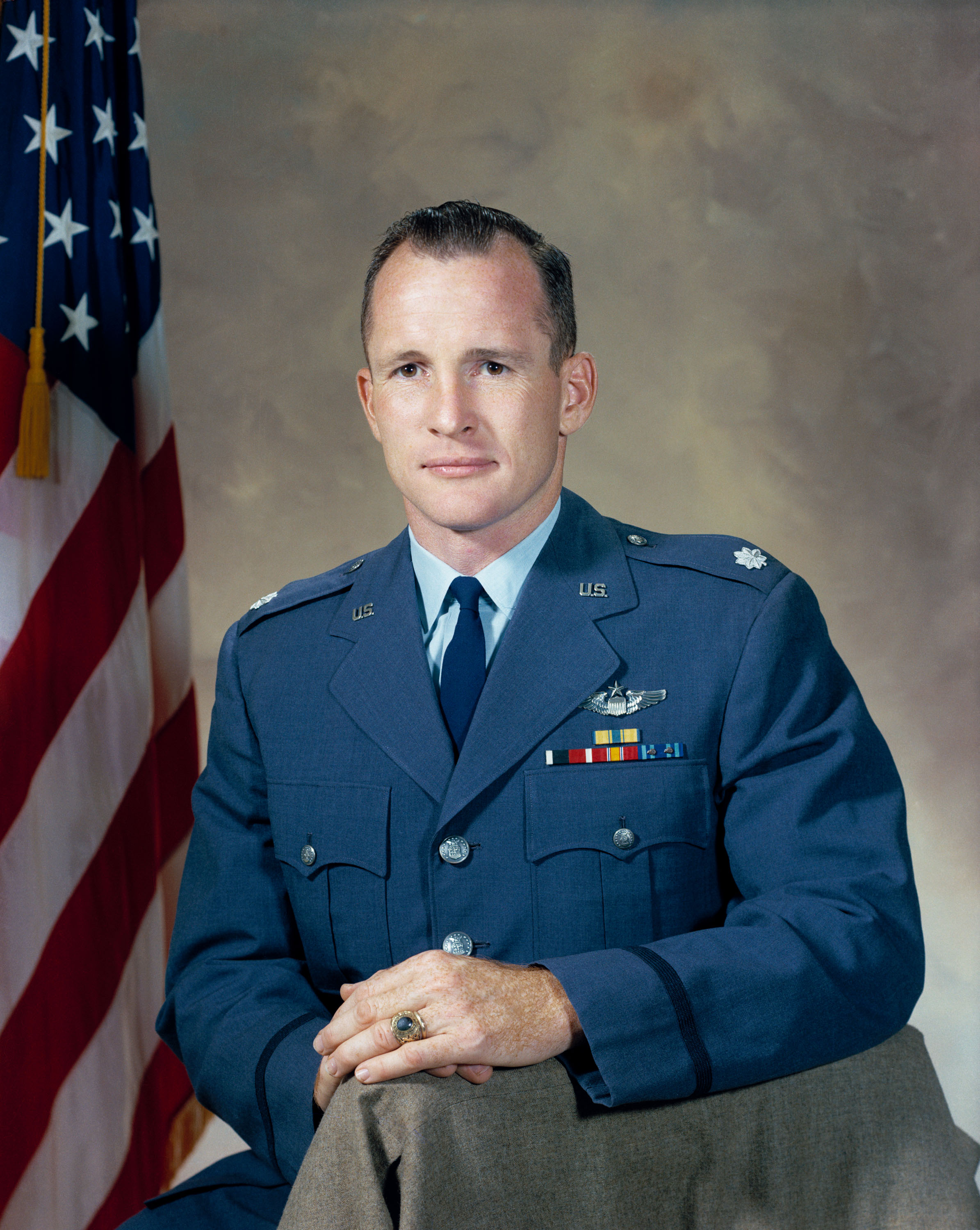
Ed White, inducted 1993

As its inaugural class in 1990, the Hall of Fame inducted the United States' original group of astronauts: the Mercury Seven. In addition to being the first American astronauts, they set several firsts in American spaceflight, both auspicious and tragic. Alan Shepard was the first American in space and later became one of the twelve people to walk on the Moon. John Glenn was the first American to orbit the Earth and after his induction went on, in 1998, to become the oldest man to fly in space, aged 77. Gus Grissom was the first American to fly in space twice and was the commander of the ill-fated Apollo 1, which resulted in the first astronaut deaths directly related to preparation for spaceflight.

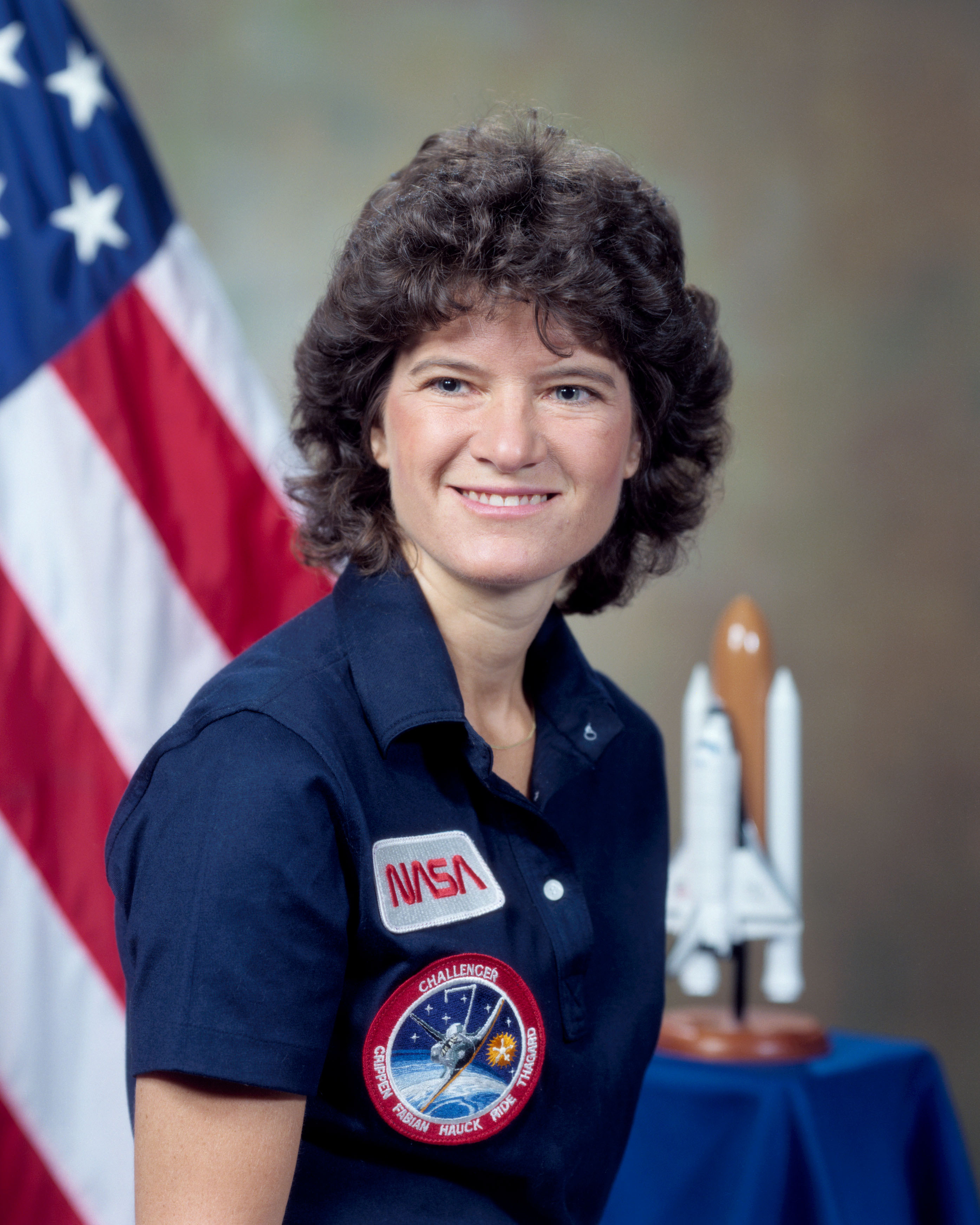
Sally Ride, inducted 2003

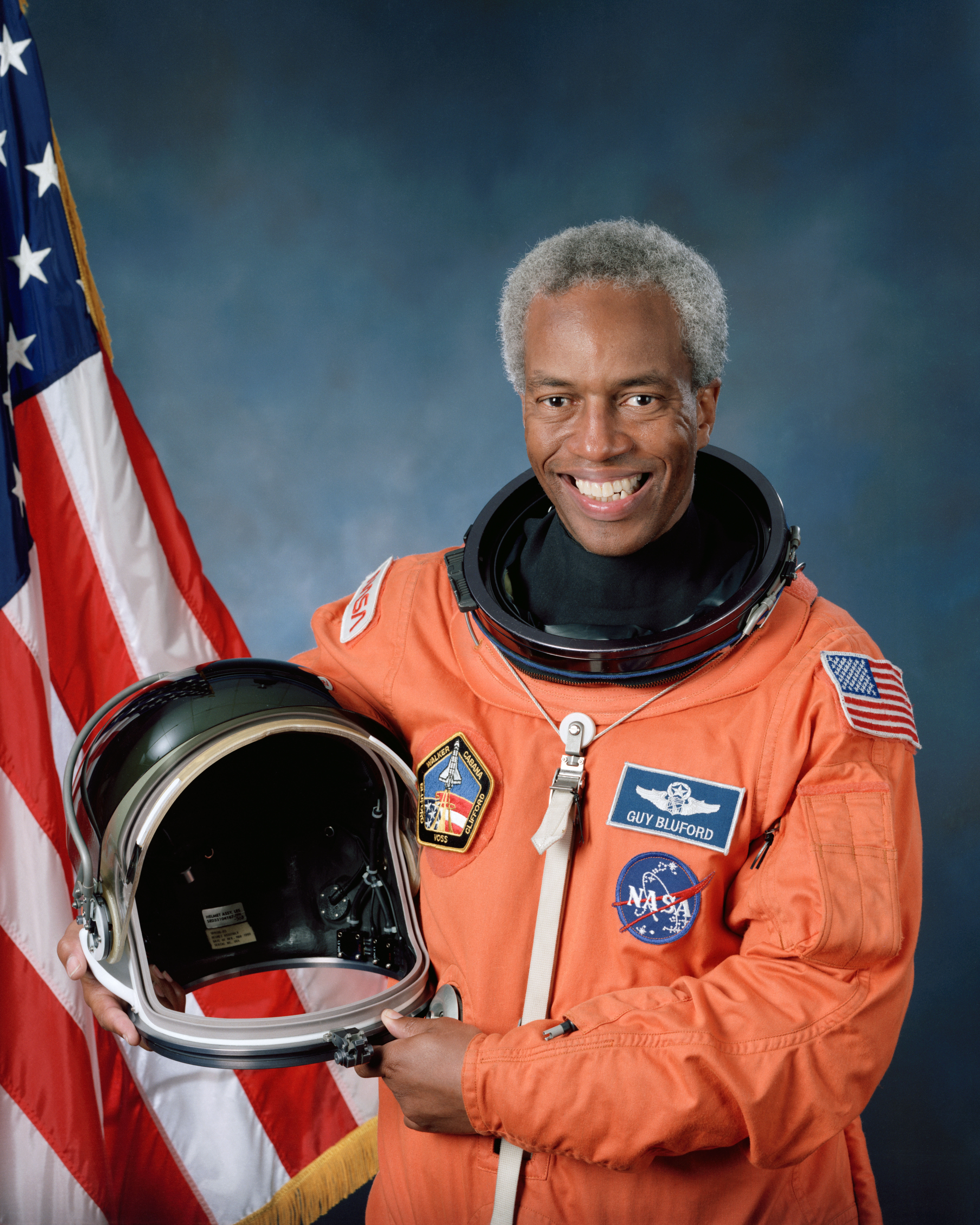
Guy Bluford, inducted 2010

Thirteen astronauts from the Gemini and Apollo programs were inducted in the second class of 1993. This class included the first and last humans to walk on the Moon, Neil Armstrong and Eugene Cernan; Ed White, the first American to walk in space (also killed in the Apollo 1 accident); Jim Lovell, commander of the famously near-tragic Apollo 13; and John Young, whose six flights included a moonwalk and command of the first Space Shuttle mission.

The third class was inducted in 1997 and consisted of the 24 additional Apollo, Skylab, and ASTP astronauts. Notable members of the class were Roger Chaffee, the third astronaut killed in the Apollo 1 fire and the only unflown astronaut in the Hall; Harrison Schmitt, the first scientist and next-to-last person to walk on the Moon; and Jack Swigert and Fred Haise, the Apollo 13 crewmembers not previously inducted.

The philosophy regarding the first three groups of inductees was that all astronauts who flew in NASA's "pioneering" programs (which would include Mercury, Gemini, Apollo, Apollo Applications Program (Skylab), and Apollo-Soyuz Test Project) would be included simply by virtue of their participation in a spaceflight in these early programs. The first group (the inaugural class of 1990) would only include the original Mercury astronauts (most of whom would go on to fly in later programs). The second group of inductees would include those astronauts who began their spaceflight careers during Gemini (all of whom would go on to fly in later programs). The third group of inductees would include those astronauts who began their spaceflight careers during Apollo, Skylab, and ASTP (some of whom would go on to fly in the Space Shuttle program). Since it would not be practical (or meaningful) to induct all astronauts who ever flew in space, all subsequent inductees (Space Shuttle program and beyond) are considered based on their accomplishments and contributions to the human spaceflight endeavor which would set them apart from their peers.

Over four dozen astronauts from the Space Shuttle program have been inducted since 2001. Among these are Sally Ride, the first American woman in space; Story Musgrave, who flew six missions in the 1980s and 90s; and Francis Scobee, commander of the ill-fated final Challenger mission.

The 2010 class consisted of Guion Bluford Jr., Kenneth Bowersox, Frank Culbertson and Kathryn Thornton. The 2011 inductees were Karol Bobko and Susan Helms. The 2012 inductees were Franklin Chang-Diaz, Kevin Chilton and Charles Precourt. Bonnie Dunbar, Curt Brown and Eileen Collins were inducted in 2013, and Shannon Lucid and Jerry Ross comprised the 2014 class.

Those inducted in 2015 were John Grunsfeld, Steven Lindsey, Kent Rominger, and Rhea Seddon. In 2016, inductees included Brian Duffy and Scott E. Parazynski. Ellen Ochoa and Michael Foale were announced as the 2017 class of the United States Astronaut Hall of Fame. Scott Altman and Thomas Jones followed in 2018. The 2019 inductees were James Buchli and Janet L. Kavandi.

Michael López-Alegría, Scott Kelly and Pamela Melroy were the 2020 inductees, inducted in a November 2021 ceremony. The 2022 inductees were Christopher Ferguson, David Leestma, and Sandra Magnus. Roy Bridges Jr. and Mark Kelly were the 2023 inductees. The 2024 inductees were David C. Hilmers and Marsha Ivins. Bernard A. Harris Jr. and Peggy Whitson were the 2025 inductees. Thomas Akers and Joseph R. Tanner were the 2026 inductees.

== Exhibits ==
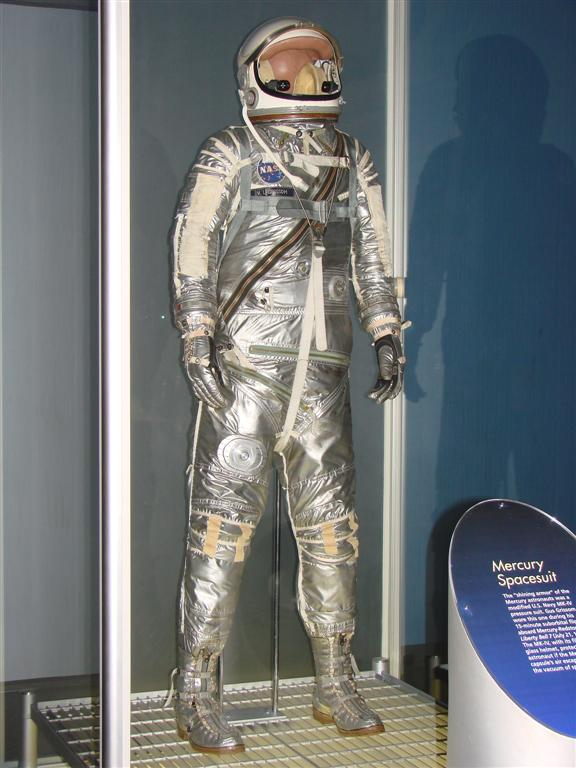
Gus Grissom's Mercury program spacesuit, worn during his 1961 Liberty Bell 7 flight

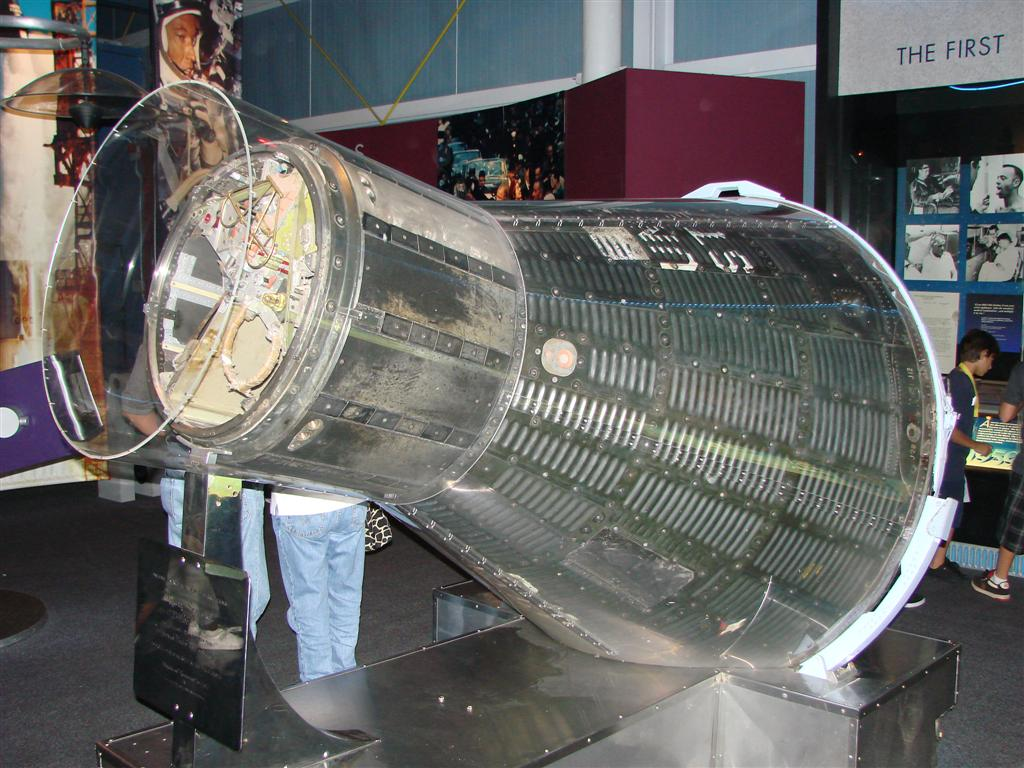
Sigma 7 Mercury spacecraft, flown by Wally Schirra in 1962

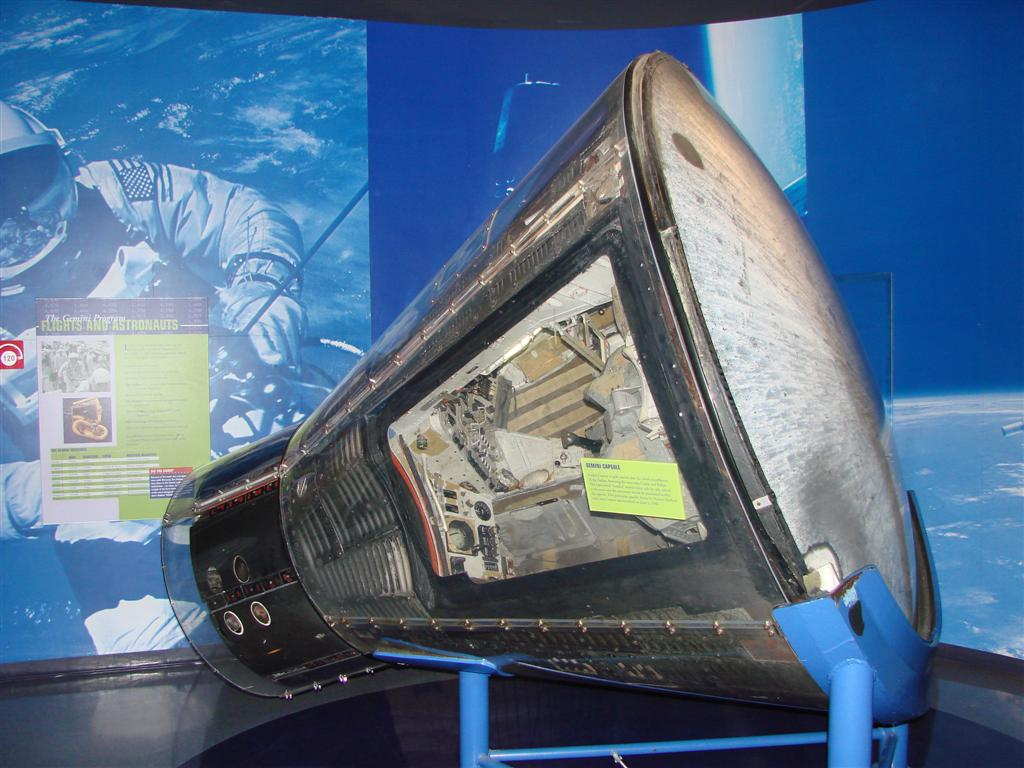
Gemini 9A capsule, flown by Thomas P. Stafford and Eugene Cernan in 1966

The Hall of Heroes is composed of tributes to the inductees. Among the Hall of Fame's displays is Sigma 7, the Mercury spacecraft piloted by Wally Schirra which orbited the Earth six times in 1962, and the Gemini 9A capsule flown by Gene Cernan and Thomas P. Stafford in 1966. An Astronaut Adventure room includes simulators for use by children.

The spacesuit worn by Gus Grissom during his 1961 Liberty Bell 7 Mercury flight is on display and has been the subject of a dispute between NASA and Grissom's heirs and supporters since 2002. The spacesuit, along with other Grissom artifacts, were loaned to the original owners of the Hall of Fame by the Grissom family when it opened. After the Hall of Fame went into bankruptcy and was taken over by a NASA contractor in 2002, the family requested that all their items be returned. All of the items were returned to Grissom's family except the spacesuit, because both NASA and the Grissoms claim ownership of it. NASA claims Grissom checked out the spacesuit for a show and tell at his son's school, and then never returned it to NASA, while the Grissoms claim Gus rescued the spacesuit from a scrap heap and therefore it belongs to them.

== Gallery ==
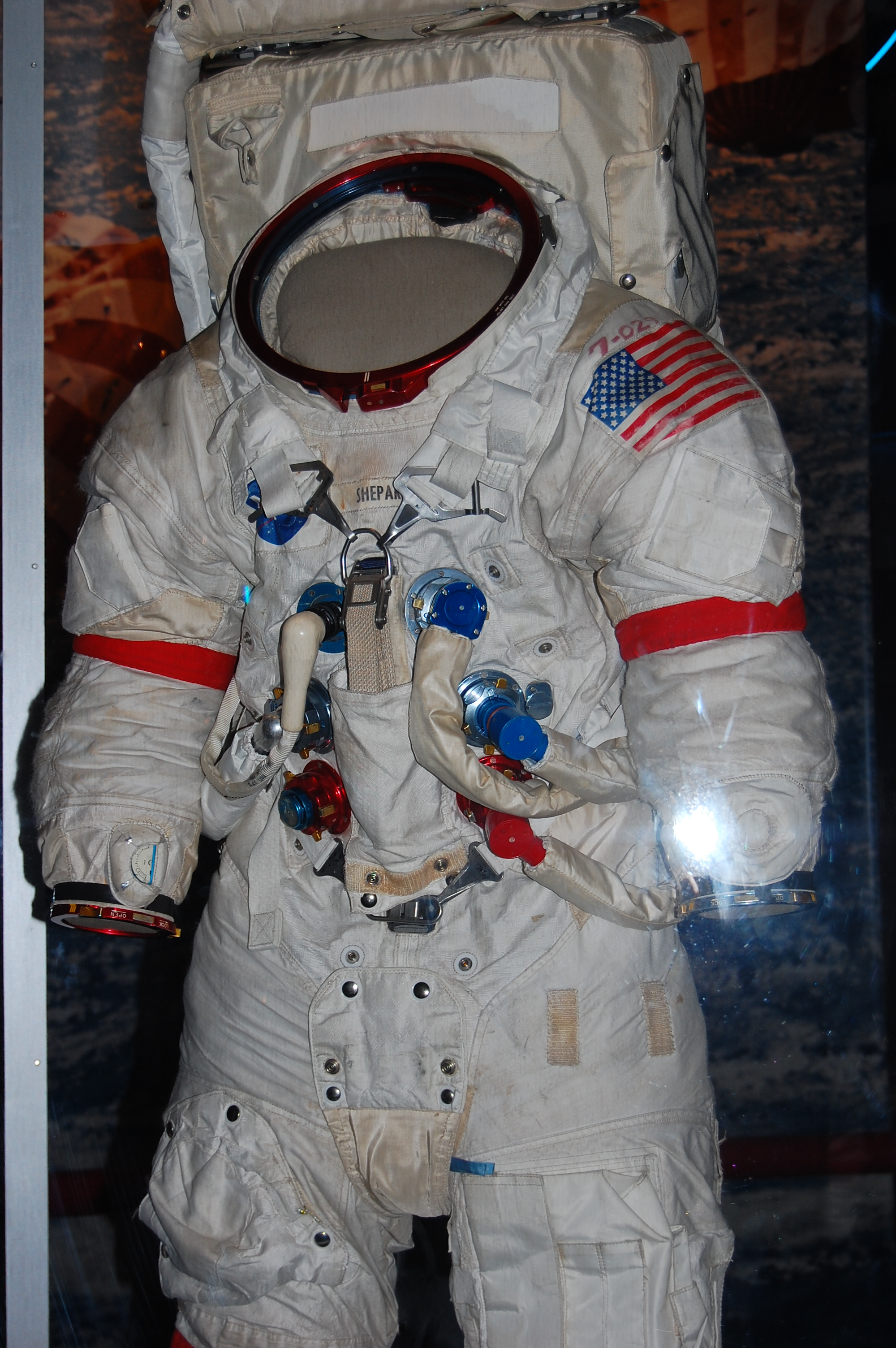
Alan Shepard's Apollo 14 lunar space suit

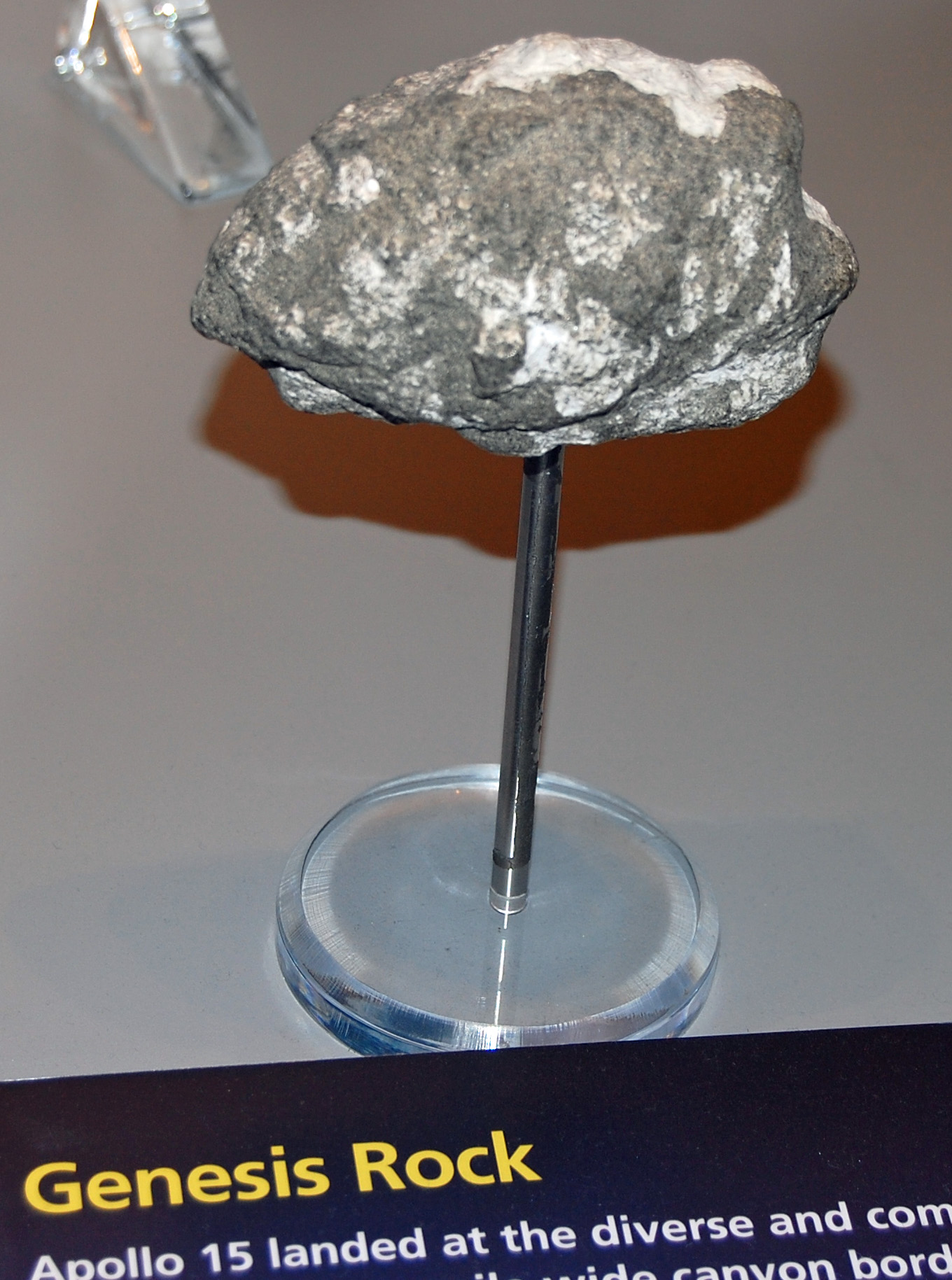
Replica of Apollo 15 Genesis Rock

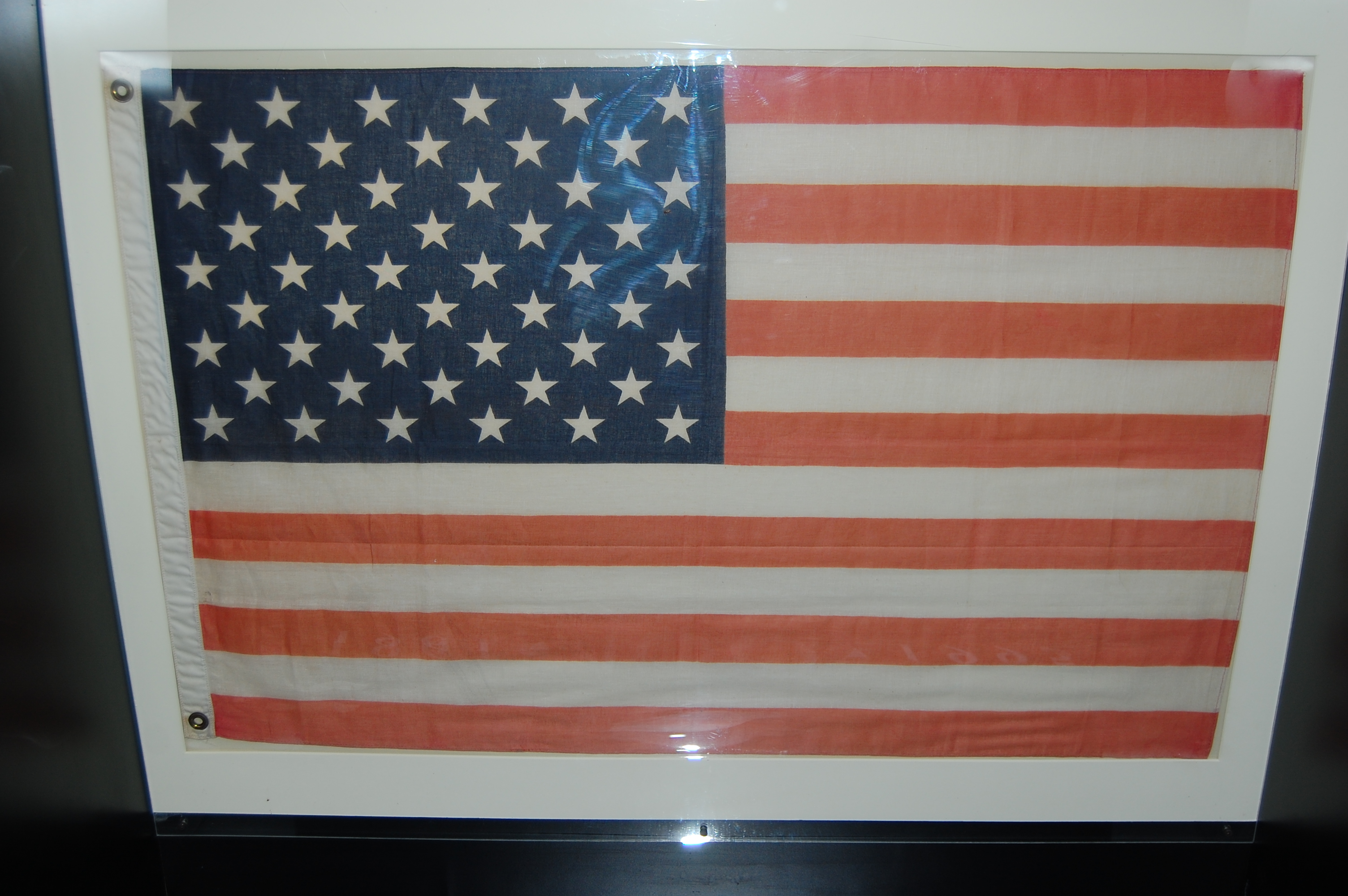
Flag flown on the first crewed US spaceflight (Freedom 7 in 1961) and the 100th (STS-71 in 1995)

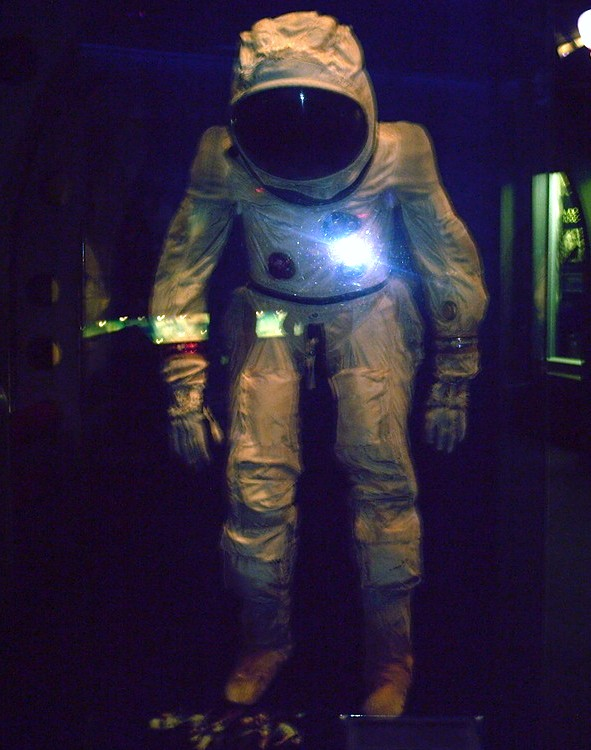
A Gemini 7 G5C spacesuit

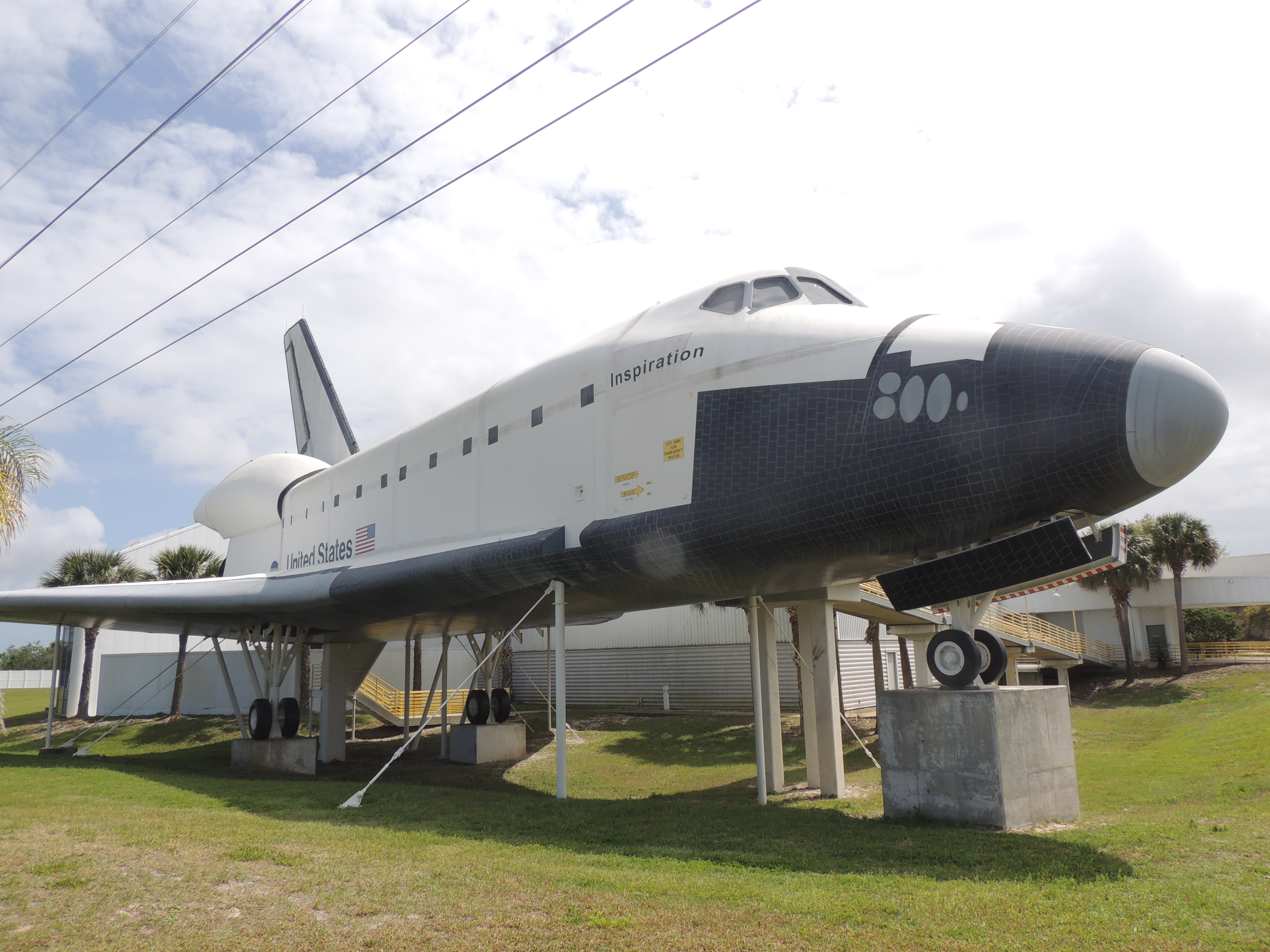
Full-scale replica of a Space Shuttle orbiter which once stood adjacent to the United States Astronaut Hall of Fame

== See also ==
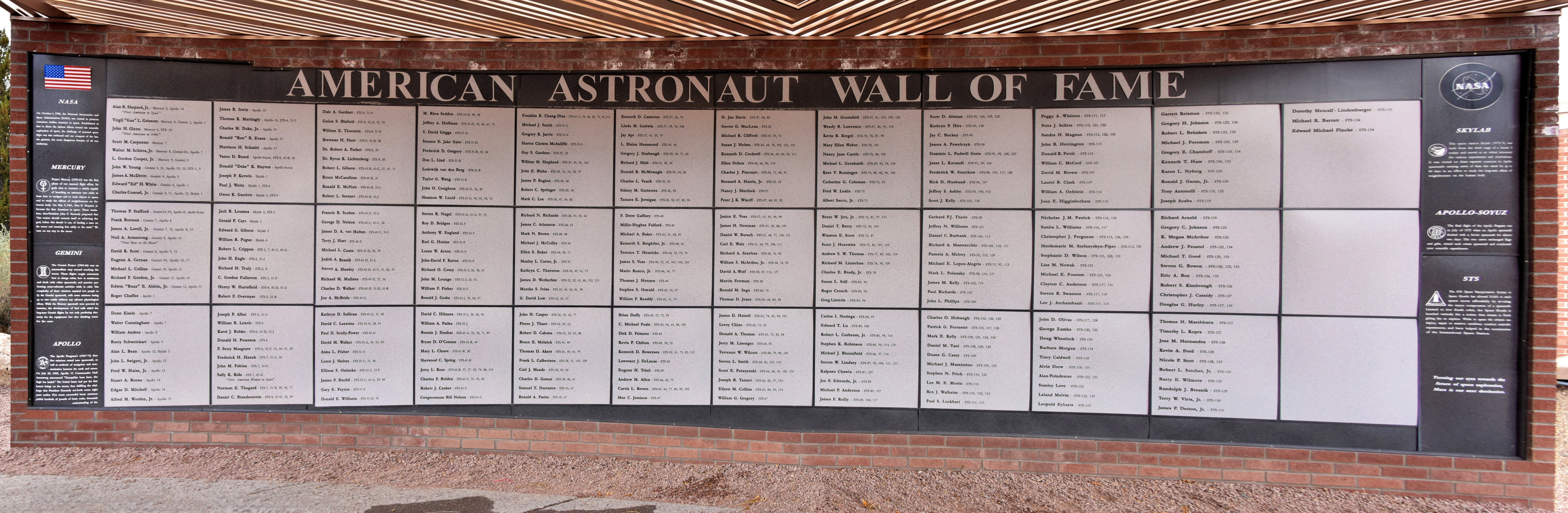
The American Astronaut Wall of Fame at the Meteor Crater site near Winslow, Arizona.

- Kennedy Space Center Visitor Complex
- List of astronauts by year of selection for training
- Space Mirror Memorial
- US Space Walk of Fame
- International Space Hall of Fame
- List of aerospace museums
- North American aviation halls of fame
