= Challenger Center for Space Science Education =

United States nonprofit organization

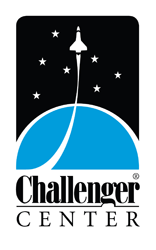
Logo

Challenger Center for Space Science Education is a United States 501(c)(3) non-profit organization headquartered in Washington, DC. It was founded in 1986 by the families of the astronauts who died in the Space Shuttle Challenger disaster on January 28, 1986.

The organization's mission is to inspire and educate students in science, technology, engineering, and math (STEM) through hands-on, immersive learning experiences that simulate space missions.

Challenger Learning Centers give students the chance to become astronauts and engineers and solve real-world problems as they participate in missions through the Solar System. Using space simulation and role-playing strategies, students bring their classroom studies to life.

== United States ==
Center name	Location
Challenger Learning Center of Alaska	Kenai, Alaska
Challenger Learning Center at the Columbia Memorial Space Center	Downey, California
Nierman Challenger Learning Center	San Diego, California
Challenger Learning Center of Colorado	Colorado Springs, Colorado
Challenger Learning Center at the Discovery Museum	Bridgeport, Connecticut
Challenger Learning Center of Tallahassee	Tallahassee, Florida
Challenger Center Hawaii at Barbers Point Elementary School	Kapolei, Hawaii
Challenger Learning Center at Heartland Community College	Normal, Illinois
Challenger Learning Center of Woodstock	Woodstock, Illinois
Challenger Learning Center of Northwest Indiana	Hammond, Indiana
Challenger Learning Center of Kentucky	Hazard, Kentucky
Challenger Learning Center - Louisville	Louisville, Kentucky
Challenger Learning Center at Paducah	Paducah, Kentucky
Challenger Learning Center of Maine	Bangor, Maine
Challenger Learning Center at Howard B. Owens Science Center	Lanham, Maryland
Challenger Learning Center at the Christa Corrigan McAuliffe Center, Framingham State University	Framingham, Massachusetts
Challenger Learning Center at St. Clair County Community College	Port Huron, Michigan
Challenger Learning Center – St. Louis	St. Louis, Missouri
Challenger Learning Center of Las Cruces	Las Cruces, New Mexico
Buehler Challenger & Science Center	Paramus, New Jersey
Challenger Learning Center of the Twin Tier Region	Allegany, New York
Challenger Center of Lockport	Lockport, New York
NYC Center for Aerospace and Applied Mathematics	New York City, New York
Challenger Learning Center of Greater Rochester	Rochester, New York
Challenger Learning Center of Dayton	Dayton, Ohio
Challenger Learning Center of Lake Erie West	Oregon, Ohio
Challenger Learning Center of Richland County School District One	Columbia, South Carolina
Challenger Learning Center at Montgomery County Community College Pottstown	Pottstown, Pennsylvania
Challenger STEM Learning Center; University of Tennessee Chattanooga	Chattanooga, Tennessee
Challenger Learning Center at Texas State Technical College Harlingen	Harlingen, Texas
Challenger Learning Center at the Scobee Education Center, San Antonio College	San Antonio, Texas
Challenger Learning Center at Texas State Technical College Waco	Waco, Texas
John Fluke Jr. Challenger Learning Center at The Museum of Flight	Seattle, Washington
Challenger Learning Center at Wheeling Jesuit University	Wheeling, West Virginia

== History ==
Challenger Center was established in the aftermath of the Challenger disaster on January 28, 1986, when the Space Shuttle Challenger exploded during its launch, killing all seven crew members. The families of the crew members, including Christa McAuliffe, who was a teacher and the first private citizen selected to fly in space, founded the organization as a living tribute to the crew and to continue their commitment to education. Their goal was to create a living memorial for the crew and to inspire future generations to pursue careers in STEM fields.

The first Challenger Learning Center opened in Houston, Texas, in 1988. Since then, the organization has grown to include over 30 Challenger Learning Centers across the United States, Canada, and several other countries. In addition to the centers, Challenger Center also offers educational programs for schools and teachers, as well as online resources for students.

== Missions and programs ==
Challenger Center's programs are designed to engage students in immersive learning experiences that simulate space missions. These experiences incorporate STEM education concepts, teamwork, problem-solving, critical thinking, and communication skills. Programs are designed for students in grades K-12, as well as for college and adult learners.

Challenger Center's flagship program is the Challenger Learning Center Mission Simulation, a two-hour simulated space mission that places students in roles such as mission commander, navigator, medical officer, and engineer. Students work together to complete a space mission, solve problems, and overcome challenges. The mission simulations are supported by curriculum resources and professional development for educators.

Challenger Center also offers e-Mission simulations, which allow students to participate in space missions virtually, using video conferencing and online resources. In addition, the organization provides teacher professional development programs, student summer camps, and community outreach initiatives.

== Impact ==
Since its founding, Challenger Center has impacted more than 6 million students and 250,000 educators worldwide. The organization's immersive learning experiences have been shown to increase students' interest in STEM subjects and improve their critical thinking and problem-solving skills.

Challenger Center has also received numerous awards and accolades for its work in STEM education. In 2017, the organization received the National Science Board's Public Service Award in recognition of its contributions to STEM education and has been recognized by the U.S. Department of Education as a model for science education.

== International ==
- Challenger Learning Center at the Ontario Science Center (Toronto, Canada)
- Challenger Learning Center at SongAm Space Center (Gyeonggi-do, South Korea)
- Challenger Learning Center at the National Space Centre (Leicester, United Kingdom)

== Board of directors ==
Notable members of the Board of Directors include:

- Charles Resnik MD - Brother of Judith Resnik

== Governance and funding ==
Challenger Center is governed by a board of directors, which includes family members of the Challenger crew and business leaders. The organization is funded through a combination of private donations, corporate partnerships, and grants from government agencies.
