= List of spacecraft prefixes =

A spacecraft prefix is a combination of letters, usually abbreviations, used in front of the name of a spacecraft, and its purpose is often analogous to more conventional ship prefixes. This list does not include prefixes used on rockets, rocket launches, and spaceflights. Non-productive prefixes (e.g. CSS in CSS Skywalker) are also not included in the list.

== Prefixes ==
Prefix	Meaning	Purpose
CM	Command Module	Used to denote individual Apollo command modules (e.g. CM Columbia).
CSM	Command and Service Module	Used to denote individual Apollo command and service modules (e.g. CSM Columbia).
DOS	Long-duration Orbital Station	Used to denote individual civilian Salyut stations (e.g. DOS-5) and Salyut-derived modules (e.g. DOS-8).
LM	Lunar Module	Used to denote individual Apollo Lunar Modules (e.g. LM Eagle). (Note: The acronym LEM (Lunar Excursion Module) was previously used for that purpose, but was preceded by LM in 1966.)
OK	Orbital Ship (Note: Russian: Орбитальный Корабль, romanized: Orbital'nyy Korabl')	Used to denote individual Buran-class orbiters (e.g. OK-GLI).
OPS	Orbital Piloted Station	Used to denote individual Almaz stations (e.g. OPS-3).
OV	Orbiter Vehicle	Used to denote individual Space Shuttle orbiters (e.g. OV-102 Columbia).
OTV	Orbital Test Vehicle	Used to denote X-37B vehicles and missions (e.g. OTV-1).
RSS	Reusable Space Ship	Used to denote New Shepard vehicles and capsules (e.g. RSS H. G. Wells).
VSS	Virgin Space Ship	Used to denote spaceplanes operated by Virgin Galactic (e.g. VSS Unity).
S.S.	Unknown (Space Ship?)	Used by Northrop Grumman for Cygnus spacecraft (e.g. S.S. Kalpana Chawla).
