= Space Shuttle Inspiration =

Space Shuttle mockup in the United States

Coordinates: 33°55′12.59″N 118°7′20.03″W

Inspiration
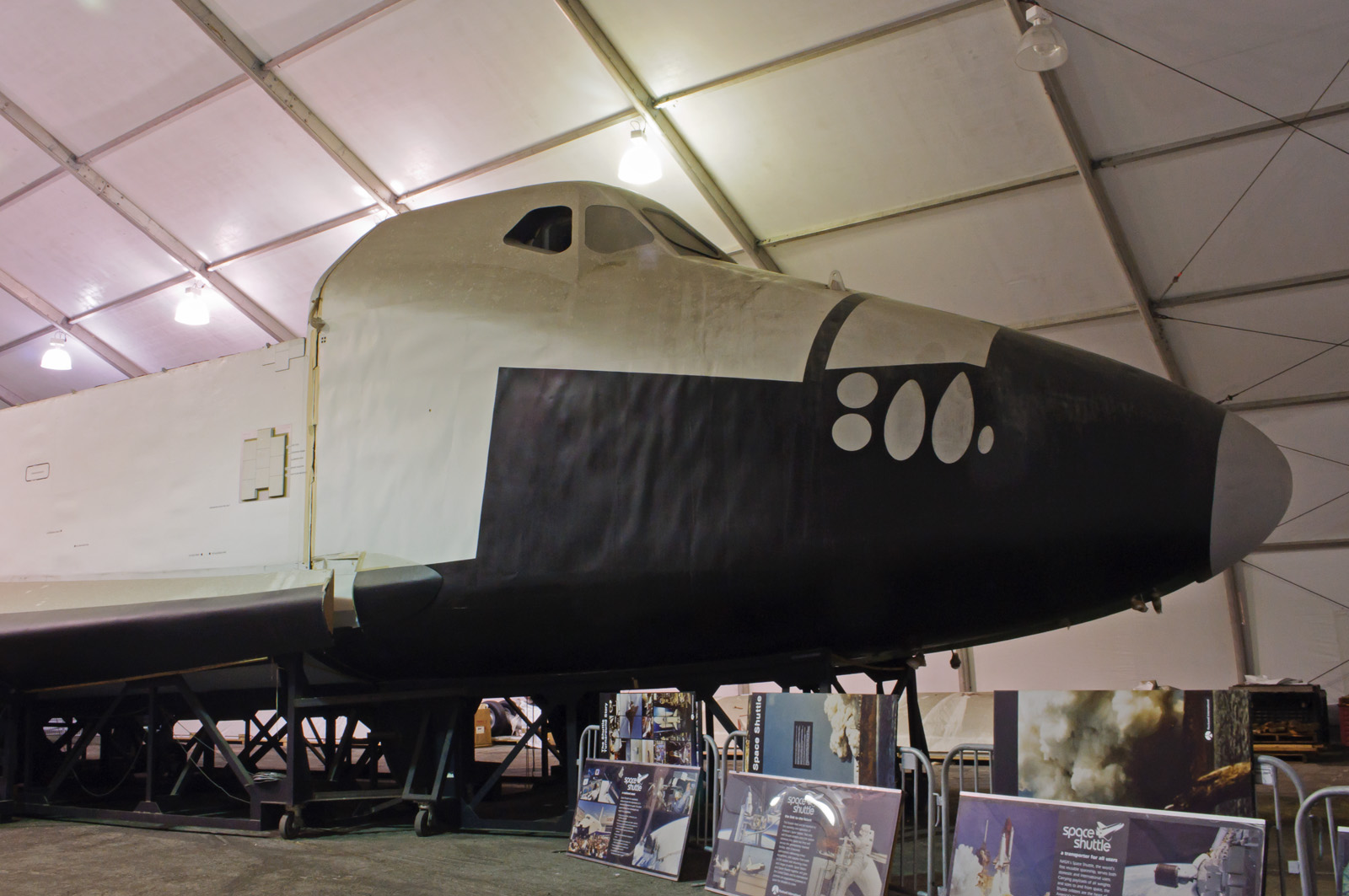
- Inspiration on display in January 2013
- Country: United States
- Contract award: 1972
- Status: In storage

Space Shuttle Inspiration is a full-scale mockup of a Space Shuttle orbiter built in 1972 by North American Rockwell to support the development and approval of the Space Shuttle program. Constructed to match the general dimensions of actual orbiters, the mockup was used to demonstrate the shuttle concept to NASA and the United States Congress, and to assist in early design work.

After its initial use, the mockup remained in storage for several decades before being placed on temporary display at the Columbia Memorial Space Center in Downey, California in 2012. It was officially named Inspiration later that year. As of 2025, the Center is working to build a 29,000 square feet (2,700 m^{2}) expansion building to place the mockup on permanent display.

== History ==
The mockup was constructed by North American Rockwell in 1972 at its facility in Downey, California. Designed to match the approximate size and shape of a Space Shuttle orbiter, it was presented to NASA and the United States Congress to support approval of the Space Shuttle program. Because of this, it's often called "the first Space Shuttle". After the approval of the project, Rockwell used it as an engineering mockup, and it was a critical tool for the design of hydraulic systems and cable harnesses for the production orbiters, as well as for test-fitting flight hardware.

Following its use, the mockup was abandoned at the Downey facility, which was later acquired by Boeing. After Boeing closed the site in 1999, the mockup was wrapped in Tyvek sheeting and relocated within the facility to accommodate a film studio. When the site began redevelopment, efforts were made to find a permanent home for the shuttle.

In July 2012, the developers of the property arranged for the mockup to be placed on temporary display at the Columbia Memorial Space Center, located on a portion of the former Rockwell site. The mockup was officially named Inspiration on September 24, 2012, as it was the inspiration for all future orbiters.

In May 2013, the City of Downey received a $3 million federal loan to construct a community center to house the mockup. However, the city council later voted to return it to storage pending the hiring of an executive director to lead the project. On March 4–5, 2014, the structure was disassembled and moved to the city’s maintenance yard.

A 2009 grant proposal estimated the cost of restoration and a permanent facility at approximately US$1,880,000 (equivalent to $2,930,000 in 2024), divided roughly equally between the two efforts.

As of assessment, the structure showed significant deterioration. Its plywood outer shell exhibited buckling and delamination; paper-based interior components were disintegrating; and adhesives and plastics were discolored or embrittled. Clear plastic ceiling panels had developed cracks and were partially detached.

On October 17, 2024, the Columbia Memorial Space Center transported the mockup approximately 1/3 mile (0.54 km) to a temporary storage site, with plans to fully renovate it. The center announced a fundraising goal of US$50,000,000 to construct a 29,000 square feet (2,700 m^{2}) exhibition facility, scheduled for completion in 2026.

== See also ==
- Space Shuttle Independence, the full-scale mock-up made from blueprints, used as an exhibit at Space Center Houston
- Space Shuttle Pathfinder, a fit-test mock-up
