= Columbia Memorial Space Center =

The Columbia Memorial Space Center
- Established: 2009
- Location: 12400 Columbia Way; Downey, California, US
- Coordinates: 33°55′11″N 118°08′01″W
- Type: Science Museum
- Key holdings: Space Shuttle Inspiration
- Visitors: 30,000 (in 2013)
- Website: Official website

The Columbia Memorial Space Center (CMSC) is a science museum in the Los Angeles area, in the City of Downey, California, US. It is owned and operated by Downey, and open to the general public as a hands-on space museum and activity center.

== Mission ==
The center's stated mission is to "ignite people's passion in science, technology, engineering, and space while honoring Downey's aerospace history."

During the holiday season, the center holds an event called the "Apollo Capsule Lighting" which includes music, activities, and decorations.

== History ==
The site of the museum is the former Boeing/Rockwell/North American plant where all of the Apollo Command/Service Modules were built and the Space Shuttle was conceived. In 1999, when the Downey Plant closed, the City of Downey began a redevelopment effort, including an educational component. In early 2007, a builder — Tower General Contractors — was selected, and ground was broken on April 12, 2007, on the 18,000 square foot project.

STS-107 mission insignia

First opened in 2008, CMSC is recognized as the National Memorial to the Space Shuttle Columbia and its crew that was lost on STS-107.

On November 7, 2008, a propane tank exploded during the filming of an episode of the television series Bones, causing an electrical fire, without damage to the museum.

On Nov 17, 2025, the Columbia Memorial Space Center held a groundbreaking ceremony for a large expansion. The 40,000-square-foot expansion will house the Space Shuttle Inspiration mockup.

== Exhibits ==
Designated a Challenger Learning Center, the museum has a variety of camps, workshops, and other monthly events to generate interest in STEM, and hands-on exhibits. Now 20,000 square feet, the two-story building has a robotics lab, HD computer lab, and a wide range of interactive exhibits on Space Shuttle operations, living and working on the International Space Station, exploration of the Solar System, aerospace engineering, and the range of fields of study and jobs related to human and robotic space exploration.

In 2012, the first "Space Shuttle" – a wood and plastic full-scale mockup built by North American Rockwell in 1972 – was placed on temporary display at the center. Dubbed the "Space Shuttle Inspiration", it was disassembled and stored in early 2014.

In front of the center, a dummy "boilerplate" Apollo command capsule, BP-12, is on display. This was the first Apollo capsule to fly, and is now owned by the City of Downey. The center also owns Apollo Boilerplate BP-19A, which is in storage as of 2018.

== See also ==
- List of science centers
