= Mate-Demate Device =

Cranes used to lift Space Shuttle orbiters onto or off Shuttle Carrier Aircraft

The Mate-Demate Device was a specialized gantry crane designed to lift a Space Shuttle orbiter onto and off the back of a Shuttle Carrier Aircraft (SCA). Two Mate-Demate Devices were built, one at the Armstrong Flight Research Center in California, the other at the Kennedy Space Center in Florida. A third Orbiter Lifting Fixture was to serve a similar function at the Vandenberg Air Force Base, the proposed West Coast launch location for the Shuttle. It was later moved to Palmdale to support the plant where the Shuttle was built and refurbished. A portable sling was also built to support mate-demate operations away from the primary locations.

== Armstrong Flight Research Center ==
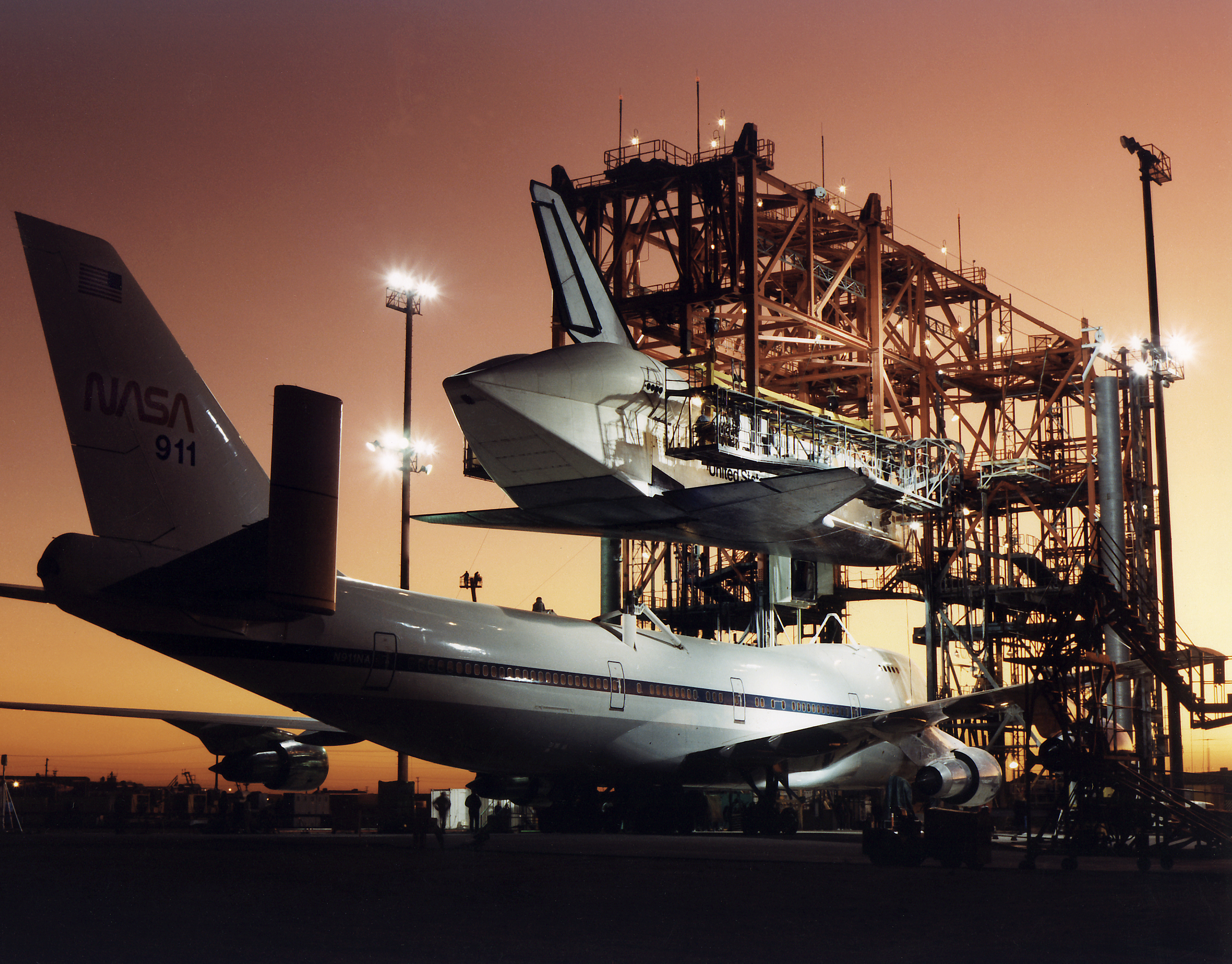
Atlantis being mated by the MDD at the Armstrong Flight Research Center in California on 7 December 1991

The first Mate-Demate Device was built at NASA's Armstrong Flight Research Center on Edwards Air Force Base, California, and completed in late 1976. It was first used with the prototype Space Shuttle Enterprise during the five Approach and Landing Tests in 1977.

While the Shuttle Landing Facility airport at Kennedy Space Center in Florida served as the primary landing site for orbiters, the longer runways at Edwards were used for 11 of the first 12 missions and remained the primary backup site throughout the Shuttle program, being used on a total of 54 out of 135 missions (40%). This MDD was used to hoist orbiters onto the Shuttle Carrier Aircraft for transport back to Florida.

The MDD in California consisted of two 100-foot (30 m) towers with stationary work platforms every 20 feet (6.1 m) up to the 80-foot (24 m) level. A horizontal structure was mounted at the 80-foot (24 m) level between the two towers. The horizontal unit cantilevers out 70 feet (21 m) from the main tower units. It controlled and guided a large lift beam that attached to the orbiters to raise and lower them.

Three large hoists were then used simultaneously to raise and lower the lift beam. Two of the hoists are connected to the portion of the lift beam that attaches to the rear of the orbiter, and one is attached to the portion of the beam that attaches to the front. Each hoist had a 100,000-pound (45,000 kg) lift capability. Operating together, the total lifting capacity of the three units is 240,000 pounds (110,000 kg). Two access platforms for servicing specialists could descend from the cantilevered section to the sides of the orbiter.

Connell Associates of Coral Gables, Florida, designed the MDD, which was constructed in 1976 by the George A. Fuller Company of Chicago, Illinois, for US$1,700,000 (equivalent to $9,618,421 in 2025). The MDD was dismantled in 2014 by Pantano Demolition of Manteca, California, at a cost of US$178,000 (equivalent to $242,079 in 2025).

== Kennedy Space Center ==
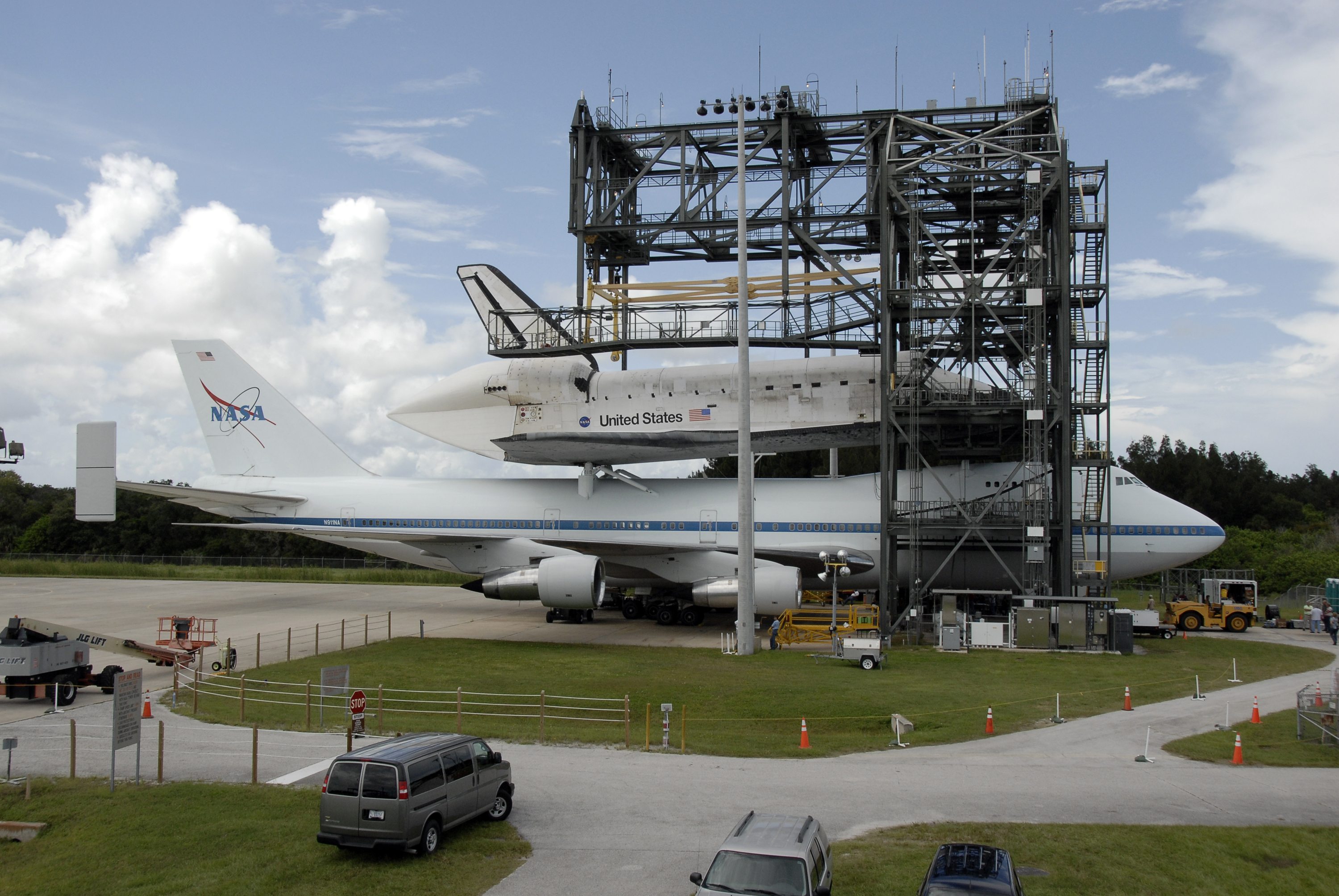
Discovery being demated by the MDD at the Shuttle Landing Facility in Florida on 21 September 2009

A similar but slightly less complex Mate-Demate Device was located at the Shuttle Landing Facility airport at the Kennedy Space Center (KSC) in Florida. The MDD was located just off the southeast end of the runway. Its primary use was unloading the orbiter after its cross-country flight from Edwards.

Like its sibling in California, the MDD in Florida consisted of two 100-foot (30 m) towers equipped with hoists, adapters and movable platforms for access to certain orbiter components and equipment. The KSC MDD's hoists had a total lifting capacity of 230,000 pounds (100,000 kg), slightly less than the California version.

The contract to build the KSC MDD was awarded during the first quarter of calendar year 1977 and it was completed in June 1978. The first use of the KSC MDD was on 19 October 1978 when the Space Shuttle Pathfinder was lifted for a fit-check. The first operational shuttle to use the KSC MDD was the Space Shuttle Columbia which was lifted up in March 1979 at the end of its delivery flight. The first air traffic control tower for the Shuttle Landing Facility was built on top of the KSC MDD. The KSC MDD was dismantled in 2014.

== Orbiter Lifting Fixture ==
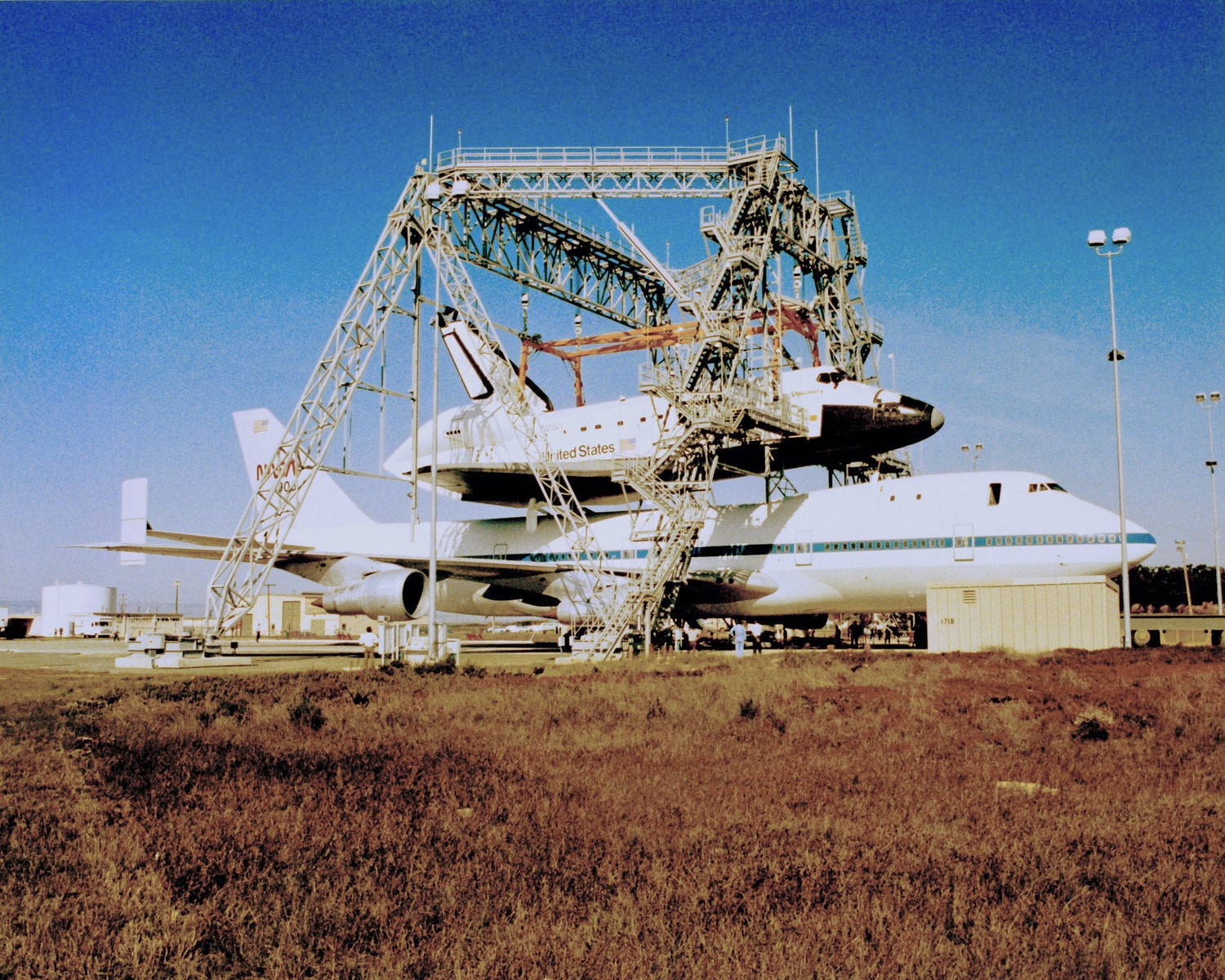
Discovery testing the Orbiter Lifting Fixture at Vandenberg on 6 November 1983.

Orbiter Lifting Fixture was a scaled-down version of the MDD planned for use exclusively at Vandenberg Air Force Base in California. It was first used by Space Shuttle Discovery during a fit-check during its initial delivery flight in November 1983 and was used to unload and load Space Shuttle Enterprise for pad fit checks at Vandenberg Space Launch Complex 6 in 1984 and 1985. Shuttle flights from the West Coast were canceled following the 1986 Space Shuttle Challenger disaster.

The Orbiter Lifting Fixture was relocated to United States Air Force Plant 42 in Palmdale, California where the orbiters were built and overhauled. The relocated Orbiter Lifting Fixture was first used for the delivery of the Space Shuttle Endeavour in 1991. Previously, the orbiters were trucked to the MDD at the Armstrong Flight Research Center at Edwards Air Force Base, about 36 miles (58 km) away, which took about 10 hours. The Orbiter Lifting Fixture was dismantled in 2008.

== Mobile sling ==
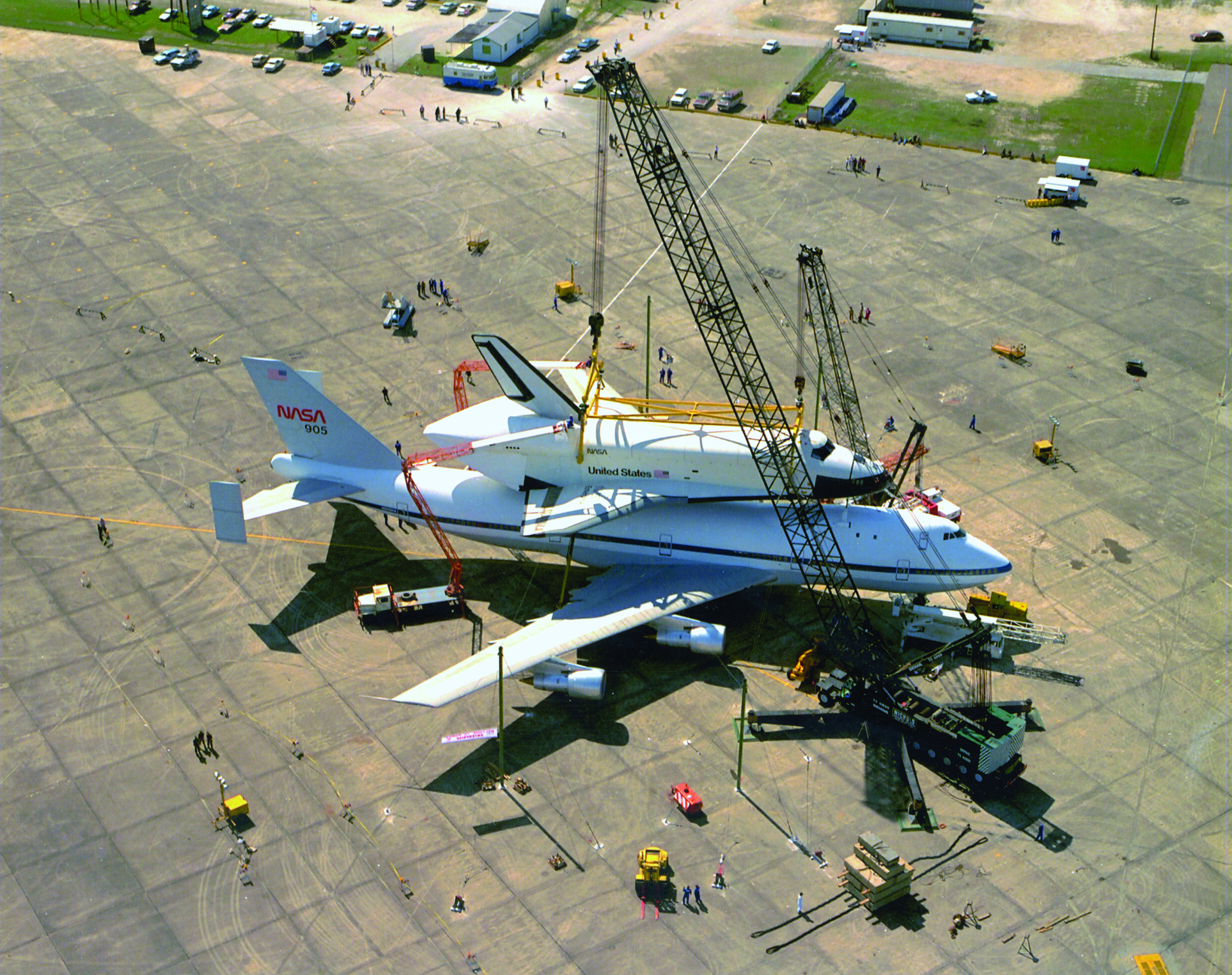
Enterprise being demated using the mobile sling in November 1985

On the rare occasions when an orbiter needed to be loaded or unloaded at a location where a permanent lifting device was not available, NASA had a special sling that could be attached to the orbiter, allowing it to be lifted by cranes. Typically, a smaller crane supported the front end of the sling, while a larger crane supported the rear. To compensate for the absence of the stabilizing structure normally provided by the MDD, an arrangement of wire ropes, masts, and winches would be set up to provide stability for the suspended Orbiter/Sling combination.

The mobile sling was used multiple times early in the Shuttle program during the late 1970s and mid-1980s to transport Space Shuttle Enterprise for display at various locations around the world. It was also used to load Space Shuttle Columbia onto an SCA when it landed at White Sands in New Mexico at the end of STS-3 in 1982.

The sling went unused between the mid-1980s and 2012, but remained on standby to transport the shuttle in the case that it landed at one of its backup landing sites other than Edwards. The sling saw heavy use in 2012 to transport Discovery, Endeavour and Enterprise to museums at the conclusion of the Shuttle program.
