= List of Space Shuttle landing sites =

Three locations in the United States were used as landing sites for the Space Shuttle system. Each site included runways of sufficient length for the slowing-down of a returning spacecraft. The prime landing site was the Shuttle Landing Facility at the Kennedy Space Center in Florida, a purpose-built landing strip. Landings also occurred at Edwards Air Force Base in California, and one took place at White Sands Space Harbor in New Mexico. No Space Shuttle landed on a dry lakebed runway after 1991.

Various international landing sites were also available in the event of a Transoceanic Abort Landing (TAL) scenario, as well as other sites in the United States and Canada in case of an East Coast Abort Landing (ECAL) situation. Space Shuttle landings were intended to regularly take place at Vandenberg Air Force Base in California for Department of Defense missions launched from the site, but none occurred due to the cancellation of all launches from Vandenberg.

== Kennedy Space Center ==
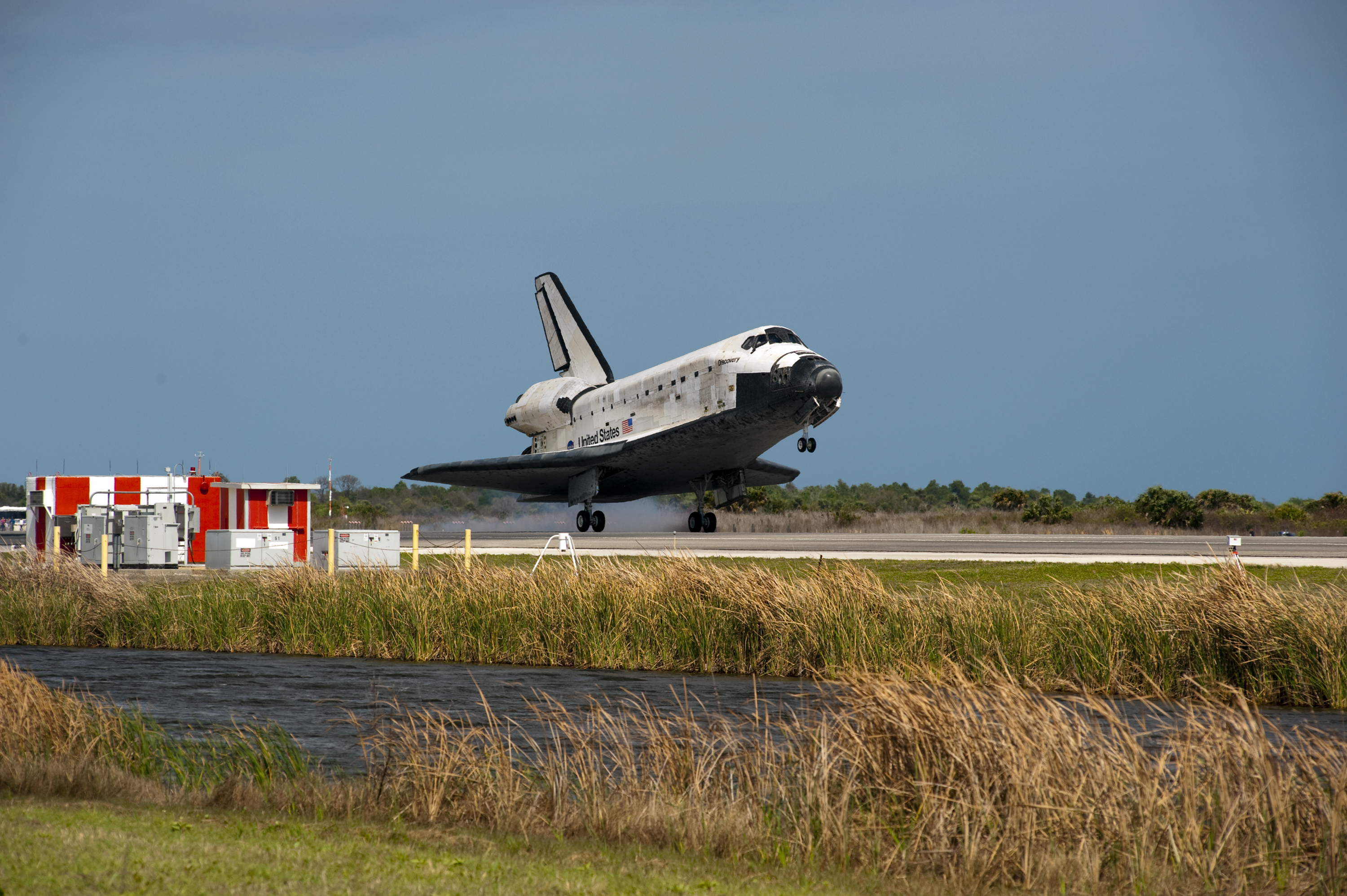
Discovery lands at Kennedy Space Center for the last time, March 2011

The Shuttle Landing Facility at the Kennedy Space Center in Florida has a single 15,000-foot (4,600 m) concrete runway, 15/33. It is designated Runway 15 or 33, depending on the direction of use. The first landing at the SLF was for mission STS-41B in 1984; landings were suspended at the site following brake damage and a blown tire during the STS-51D landing in 1985, and resumed in 1990. Thirty-six missions landed on Runway 15 and forty-two missions landed on Runway 33, accumulating a total of 78 missions.

Runway	Surface material	Missions landed
Runway 15	Concrete	36 missions: STS-41-B, STS-51-A, STS-51-C, STS-43, STS-51, STS-60, STS-63, STS-71, STS-72, STS-79, STS-82, STS-86, STS-89, STS-91, STS-88, STS-96, STS-101, STS-106, STS-97, STS-102, STS-104, STS-105, STS-108, STS-121, STS-116, STS-118, STS-122, STS-123, STS-124, STS-119, STS-127, STS-130, STS-133, STS-134 and STS-135
Runway 33	Concrete	42 missions: STS-41-G, STS-51-D, STS-38, STS-45, STS-50, STS-46, STS-47, STS-52, STS-54, STS-56, STS-57, STS-61, STS-60, STS-62, STS-65, STS-70, STS-69, STS-73, STS-74, STS-75, STS-77, STS-78, STS-80, STS-81, STS-83, STS-84, STS-94, STS-85, STS-87, STS-90, STS-95, STS-93, STS-103, STS-99, STS-109, STS-110, STS-112, STS-113, STS-115, STS-120, STS-129, STS-131, and STS-132

== Edwards Air Force Base ==
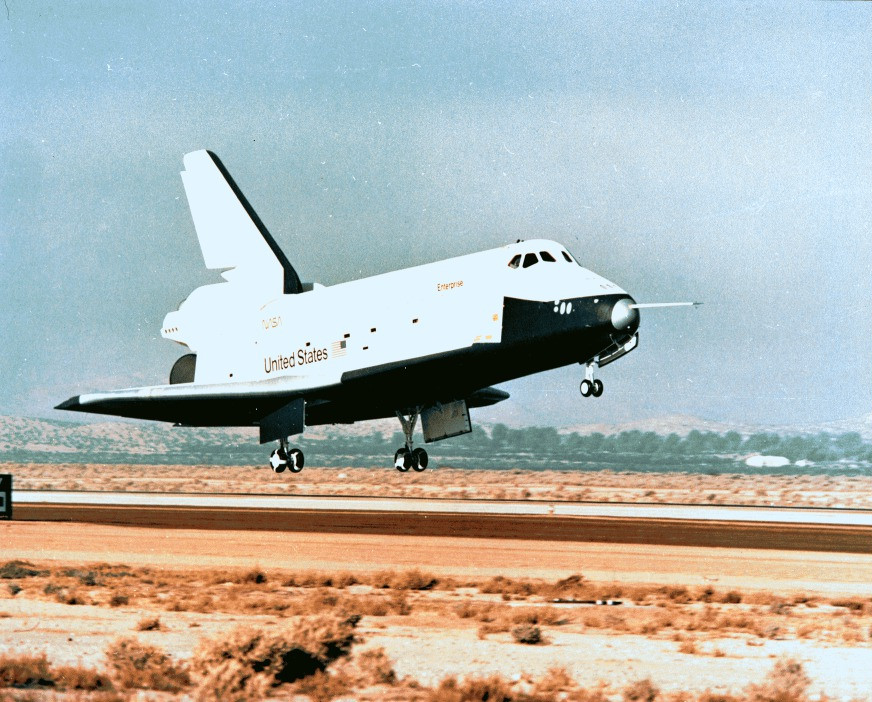
ALT-16 comes to an end as Enterprise lands on runway 04 at Edwards AFB

Edwards Air Force Base in California was the site of the first Space Shuttle landing and became a backup site to the prime landing location, the Shuttle Landing Facility at the Kennedy Space Center. Several runways are arrayed on the dry lakebed at Rogers Dry Lake, and there are also concrete runways. Space shuttle landings on the lake bed took place on Runways 05/23, 15/33 and 17/35. Of the concrete strips, the main Runway 04/22 was utilized. During the renovation of 04/22, a temporary runway (with the same designation) was constructed parallel to it and used for one landing (STS-126). Five ALT free flights and fifty-four operational Space Shuttle missions landed on Edwards Air Force Base runways, making a total of fifty-nine.

Runway	Surface material	Missions landed
Runway 05	Dry lakebed	1 mission (STS-44)
Runway 23	Dry lakebed	8 missions (STS-1, STS-2, STS-51-G, STS-51-F, STS-51-I, STS-51-J, STS-34 and STS-36)
Runway 15	Dry lakebed	2 missions: ALT-14 and STS-7
Runway 33	Dry lakebed	1 mission: STS-37
Runway 17	Dry lakebed	11 missions: ALT-12, ALT-13, ALT-15, STS-9, STS-41-C, STS-41-D, STS-51-B, STS-61-A, STS-26, STS-27 and STS-28
Runway 35	Dry lakebed	(none)
Runway 04	Concrete	3 missions: ALT-16, STS-33, STS-64
Runway 22	Concrete	32 missions: STS-4, STS-5, STS-6, STS-8, STS-61-B, STS-61-C, STS-29, STS-30, STS-32, STS-31, STS-41, STS-35, STS-40, STS-48, STS-42, STS-49, STS-53, STS-55, STS-58, STS-59, STS-68, STS-66, STS-67, STS-76, STS-92, STS-98, STS-100, STS-111, STS-114, STS-117, STS-125 and STS-128
Runway 04 (Temporary)	Asphalt	1 mission: STS-126

== White Sands ==
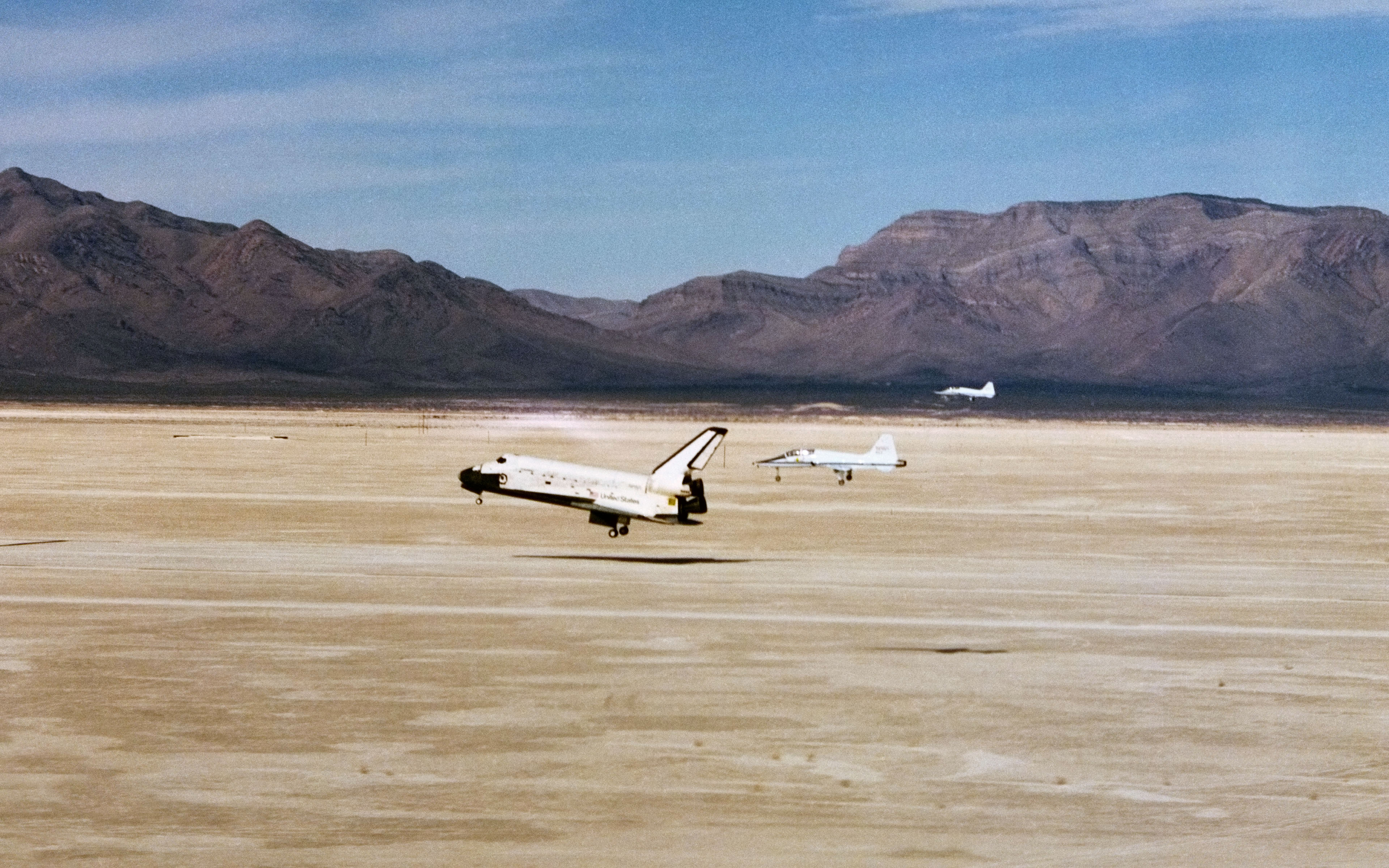
Columbia (STS-3) landing on Northrop Strip at White Sands Space Harbor, 30 March 1982, flanked by two T-38 chase planes

White Sands Space Harbor at White Sands Test Facility in New Mexico was an emergency landing site for the Space Shuttle and was used as a backup when the runways at Edwards Air Force Base and the Kennedy Space Center were unavailable. Two 35,000 feet (11,000 m) runways and a 12,800-foot (3,900 m) runway were available for landings on the dry lake bed. One mission, STS-3, used Runway 17 for a landing due to flooding at its originally planned landing site, Edwards Air Force Base.

Runway	Surface material	Missions landed
Runway 17	Dry lakebed	STS-3

== Transoceanic abort landing sites ==
In the event of an abort during launch, NASA had several international locations designated as transoceanic abort landing (TAL) sites. All sites have runways of sufficient length to support the landing of a Space Shuttle, and included personnel from NASA as well as equipment to aid a space shuttle landing. The sites included:

- Naval Air Station Bermuda
- Shannon Airport, Republic of Ireland
- Lajes Air Base in Terceira island, Azores, Portugal (Runway 30L is 12,109 ft (3,691 m) long)
- Zaragoza Air Base in Spain, Morón Air Base in Spain (with an 11,800 ft (3,600 m) runway)
- Istres Air Base in France (Runway 33 is 12,303 ft (3,750 m) long)

Former TAL sites include:

- Diego Garcia in the British Indian Ocean Territory
- Cologne Bonn Airport in Germany
- Ben Guerir Air Base, Morocco (1988–2002)
- Casablanca, Morocco (up to 1986)
- Banjul International Airport, The Gambia (1987–2002)
- Dakar, Senegal
- Rota, Spain
- Kano, Nigeria
- RAF Fairford, UK

Planned TAL sites for launches from Vandenberg Air Force Base, which did not end up happening:

- Hao and Easter Island in the Pacific Ocean
- Andersen AFB, Guam (with one of the longest concrete runways in the world)

== East Coast abort landing sites ==
In certain launch abort situations where the mission profile supports a trajectory for such a landing, runways on the East Coast of the United States and Canada could have been used for an East Coast abort landing (ECAL) situation. The following sites could have been used for an ECAL:

Landing Site	Location	Country
Miami International Airport	Miami, Florida	United States
Plattsburgh International Airport	Plattsburgh, New York	United States
Francis S. Gabreski Airport	Westhampton Beach, New York	United States
Atlantic City International Airport	Atlantic City, New Jersey	United States
Myrtle Beach International Airport	Myrtle Beach, South Carolina	United States
Wilmington International Airport	Wilmington, North Carolina	United States
Marine Corps Air Station Cherry Point	North Carolina	United States
Naval Air Station Oceana	Virginia	United States
Dover Air Force Base	Delaware	United States
Bangor International Airport	Bangor, Maine	United States
Loring Air Force Base	Limestone, Maine	United States
Otis Air National Guard Base	Massachusetts	United States
Westover Air Reserve Base	Massachusetts	United States
Bradley International Airport	Hartford, Connecticut	United States
Pease Air National Guard Base	Portsmouth, New Hampshire	United States
Halifax Stanfield International Airport	Goffs, Nova Scotia	Canada
Stephenville International Airport	Stephenville, Newfoundland	Canada
CFB Goose Bay	Goose Bay, Labrador	Canada
Gander International Airport	Gander, Newfoundland	Canada
St. John's International Airport	St. John's, Newfoundland	Canada

== Vandenberg Air Force Base ==
Space Shuttle missions to be launched from Vandenberg Air Force Base in California were planned to conclude with a landing at Runway 12/30 at the site. The runway was lengthened to support shuttle landings. The first landing at Vandenberg was planned for mission STS-62-A, which was scheduled for launch in July 1986, but cancelled in the wake of the STS-51-L accident. No space shuttle operations or landings ever occurred at the site.

== Other sites ==
The joint use civilian/military Lincoln Airport/Lincoln Air National Guard Base in Lincoln, Nebraska was designated as an alternate landing site for its 12,900 ft (3,932 m) long main runway. Including 1000 ft over-runs on each end, the runway totaled almost 15,000 ft in length. The site also had low air traffic, both commercial and military. No space shuttle landing ever occurred there.

Amílcar Cabral International Airport on the island of Sal, Cape Verde, was another designated emergency landing site. Runway 01/19 at Amílcar Cabral International Airport is 10,735 ft long and is paved. No Space Shuttle landing occurred here either. Also Gran Canaria Airport was used as a back-up site.

The French Istres-Le Tubé Air Base was also another designated site.

== See also ==
- Space Shuttle emergency landing sites
