= Space Shuttle Enterprise =

Space Shuttle test vehicle, used for glide tests

Enterprise
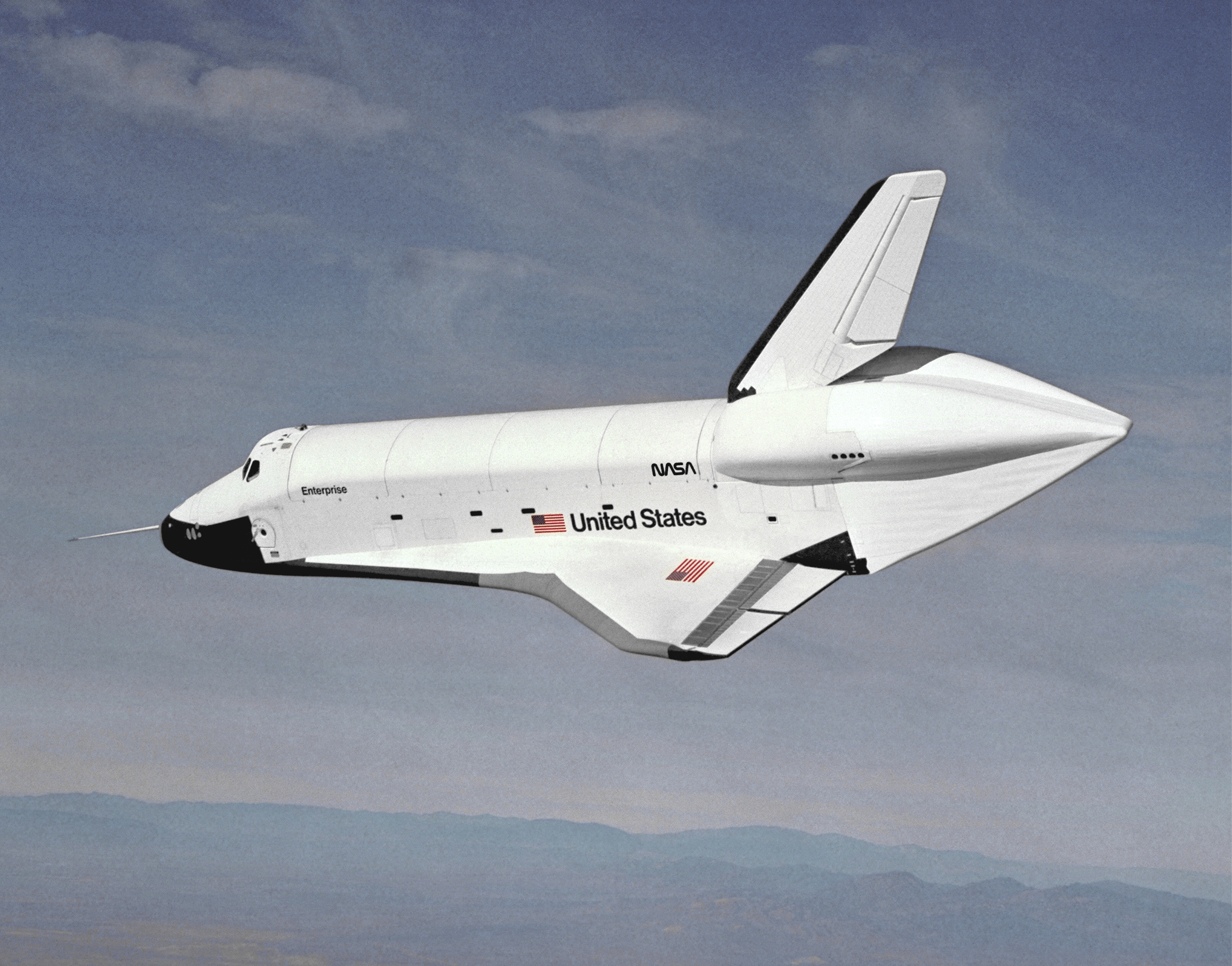
- Enterprise in flight in 1977, during ALT-13
- Type: Spaceplane
- Class: Space Shuttle orbiter
- Eponym: USS Enterprise (NCC-1701)
- Other name: Constitution (1975–1977)
- Serial no.: OV-101
- Owner: NASA
- Manufacturer: Rockwell International

History
- First flight: August 12, 1977; ALT-12
- Last flight: October 26, 1977; ALT-16
- Flights: 5
- Flight time: 20 m, 58 s above Earth
- Fate: Retired
- Location: Intrepid Museum; New York City, New York

Space Shuttle orbiters

Space Shuttle Enterprise (Orbiter Vehicle Designation: OV-101) is the first orbiter of the Space Shuttle system. Rolled out on September 17, 1976, it was built for NASA as part of the Space Shuttle program to perform atmospheric test flights after being launched from a modified Boeing 747. It was constructed without engines or a functional heat shield. As a result, it was not capable of spaceflight.

Originally, Enterprise had been intended to be refitted for orbital flight to become the second space-rated orbiter in service. However, during the construction of Space Shuttle Columbia, details of the final design changed, making it simpler and less costly to build Challenger around a body frame that had been built as a test article. Similarly, Enterprise was considered for refit to replace Challenger after the latter was destroyed, but Endeavour was built from structural spares instead.

Enterprise was restored and placed on display in 2003 at the Smithsonian's new Steven F. Udvar-Hazy Center in Virginia. Following the retirement of the Space Shuttle fleet, Discovery replaced Enterprise at the Udvar-Hazy Center, and Enterprise was transferred to the Intrepid Museum in New York City, where it has been on display since July 2012.

== Differences between Enterprise and future shuttles ==
The design of Enterprise was not the same as that planned for Columbia, the first flight model; the aft fuselage was constructed differently, and it did not have the interfaces to mount OMS pods. A large number of subsystems—ranging from main engines to radar equipment—were not installed on Enterprise, but the capacity to add them in the future was retained, as NASA originally intended to refit the orbiter for spaceflight at the conclusion of its testing. Instead of a thermal protection system, its surface was primarily covered with simulated tiles made from polyurethane foam. Fiberglass was used for the leading edge panels in place of the reinforced carbon–carbon ones of spaceflight-worthy orbiters. Only a few sample thermal tiles and some Nomex blankets were real. Enterprise used fuel cells to generate its electrical power, but these were not sufficient to power the orbiter for spaceflight.

Platform to the Stars: Space Shuttle (1980) Official NASA Space Shuttle program information film reel.

Enterprise also lacked reaction control system thrusters and hydraulic mechanisms for the landing gear; the landing gear doors were simply opened through the use of explosive bolts and the gear dropped down solely by gravity. As it was only used for atmospheric testing, Enterprise featured a large nose probe mounted on its nose cap, common on test aircraft because the location provides the most accurate readings for the test instruments, being mounted out of disturbed airflow.

Enterprise was equipped with Lockheed-manufactured zero-zero ejection seats like those its sister Columbia carried on its first four missions.

== Construction milestones ==
Date	Milestone
1972 July 26	Contract Award to North American Rockwell
1972 August 9	Construction authorization from NASA
1974 June 4	Start structural assembly of crew module at Downey plant
1974 August 26	Start structural assembly of aft fuselage at Downey plant
1975 March 27	Mid fuselage arrives at Palmdale from General Dynamics
1975 May 23	Wings arrive at Palmdale from Grumman
1975 May 25	Vertical stabilizer arrives at Palmdale from Fairchild Republic
1975 August 25	Start of Final Assembly
1975 September 9	Aft fuselage on dock, Palmdale
1975 October 31	Lower forward fuselage on dock, Palmdale
1975 December 1	Upper forward fuselage on dock, Palmdale
1976 January 16	Crew module on dock, Palmdale
1976 March 3	Payload bay doors on dock, Palmdale
1976 March 12	Complete final assembly and closeout systems installation
1976 March 15	Start functional checkout
1976 June	Complete functional checkout, start ground vibration and proof load tests
1976 September 17	Rollout from Palmdale
1976 October–November	Start systems retest, complete integrated systems checkout
1977 February 18	First captive flight
1977 June 18	First crewed captive flight
1977 August 12	First free flight

== Service ==
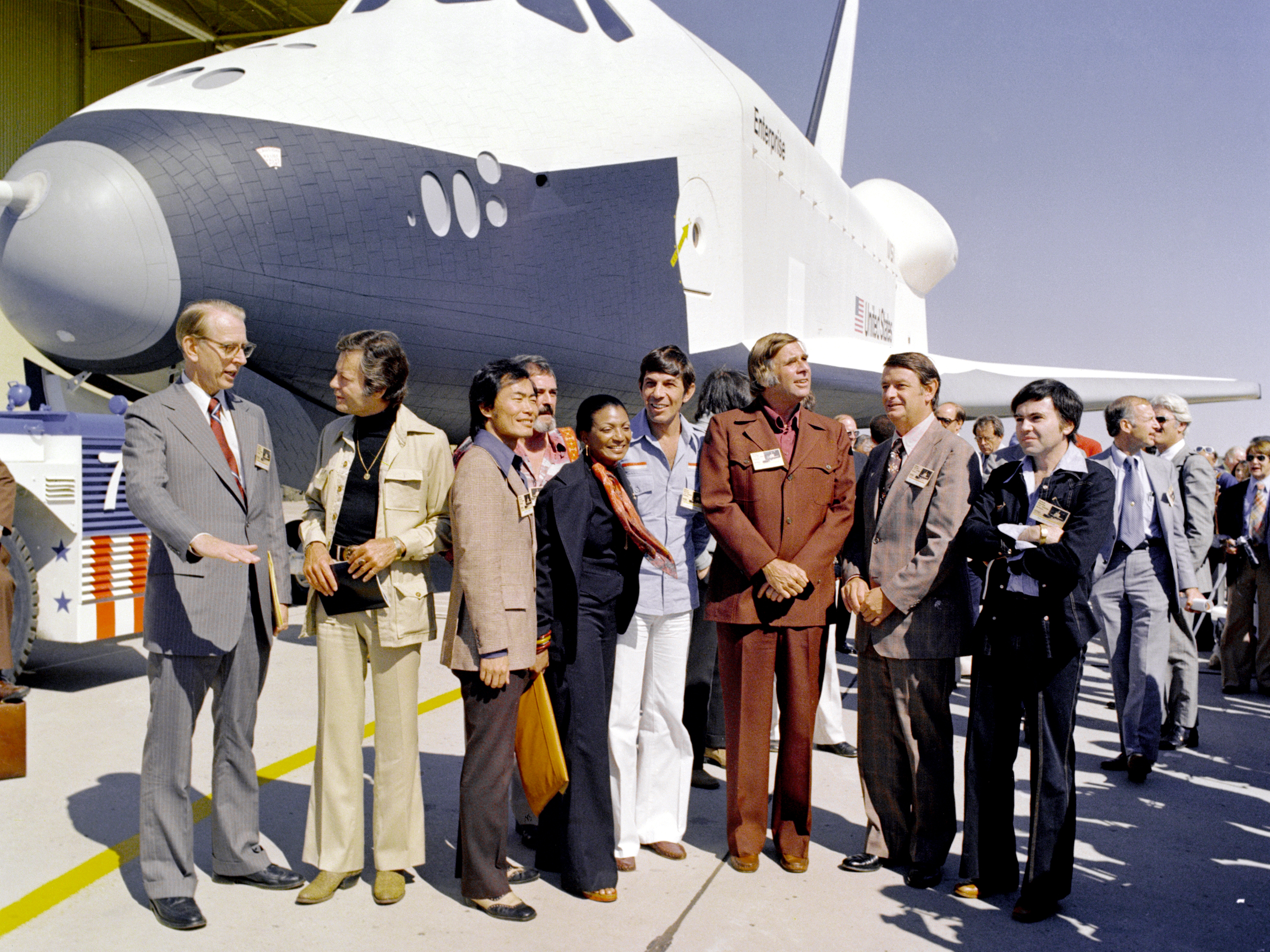
Star Trek creator Gene Roddenberry (third from right, in dark brown) with several key members of the Star Trek cast and NASA administrators at Enterprise's rollout ceremony.

Construction began on Enterprise on June 4, 1974. Designated OV-101, it was originally planned to be named Constitution and unveiled on Constitution Day, September 17, 1976. Fans of Star Trek asked US President Gerald Ford, through a letter-writing campaign, to name the orbiter after the television show's fictional starship, USS Enterprise.

In an official memo, White House advisors cited "hundreds of thousands of letters" from Trekkers, "one of the most dedicated constituencies in the country", as a reason for giving the shuttle the name. Although Ford did not publicly mention the campaign, the president said that he was "partial to the name" Enterprise because his naval unit had serviced the aircraft carrier USS Enterprise (the ship for which Star Trek's fictional craft was named) during World War II, and directed NASA officials to change the name.

In mid-1976 the orbiter was used for ground vibration tests, allowing engineers to compare data from an actual flight vehicle with theoretical models.

On September 17, 1976, Enterprise was rolled out of Rockwell's plant at Palmdale, California. In recognition of its fictional namesake, Star Trek creator Gene Roddenberry and most of the principal cast of the original series of Star Trek were on hand at the dedication ceremony.

=== Approach and landing tests (ALT) ===
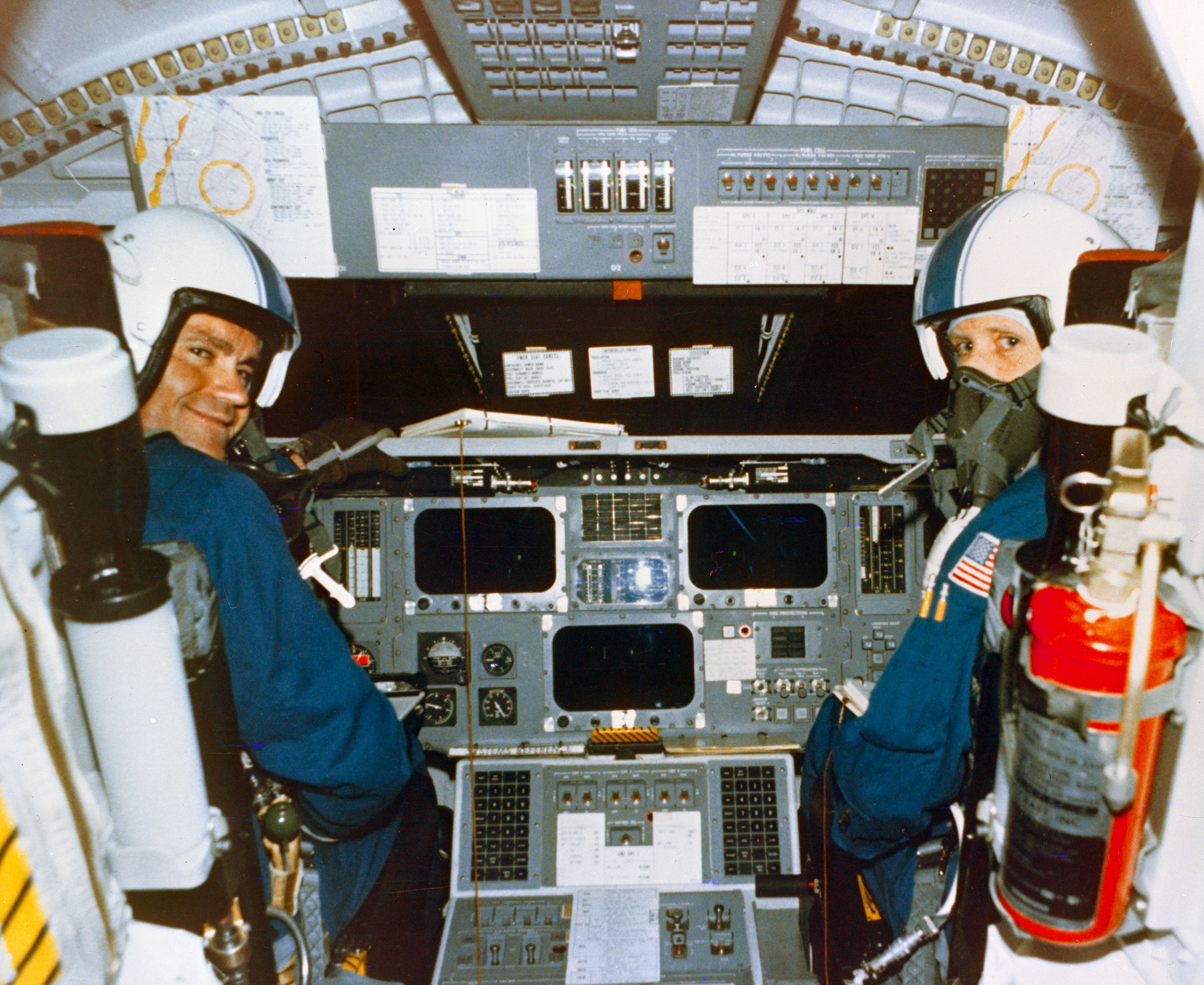
Fred Haise and Gordon Fullerton (wearing oxygen mask) in Enterprise's cockpit, 1977

On January 31, 1977, Enterprise was taken by road to Dryden Flight Research Center at Edwards Air Force Base to begin operational testing.

While at NASA Dryden, Enterprise was used by NASA for a variety of ground and flight tests intended to validate aspects of the shuttle program. The initial nine-month testing period was referred to by the acronym ALT, for "Approach and Landing Test". These tests included a maiden "flight" on February 18, 1977, atop a Boeing 747 Shuttle Carrier Aircraft (SCA) to measure structural loads and ground handling and braking characteristics of the mated system. Ground tests of all orbiter subsystems were carried out to verify functionality prior to atmospheric flight.

The mated Enterprise/SCA combination was then subjected to five test flights with Enterprise uncrewed and unactivated. The purpose of these test flights was to measure the flight characteristics of the mated combination. These tests were followed with three test flights with Enterprise crewed to test the shuttle flight control systems.

On August 12, 1977, Enterprise flew on its own for the first time. Enterprise underwent four more free flights where the craft separated from the SCA and was landed under astronaut control. These tests verified the flight characteristics of the orbiter design and were used to carry out several aerodynamic and weight configurations. The first three flights were flown with a tailcone placed at the end of Enterprise's aft fuselage, which reduced drag and turbulence when mated to the SCA. The final two flights saw the tailcone removed and mockup main engine nozzles installed. On the fifth and final glider flight, pilot-induced oscillation problems were revealed, which had to be addressed before the first orbital launch occurred.

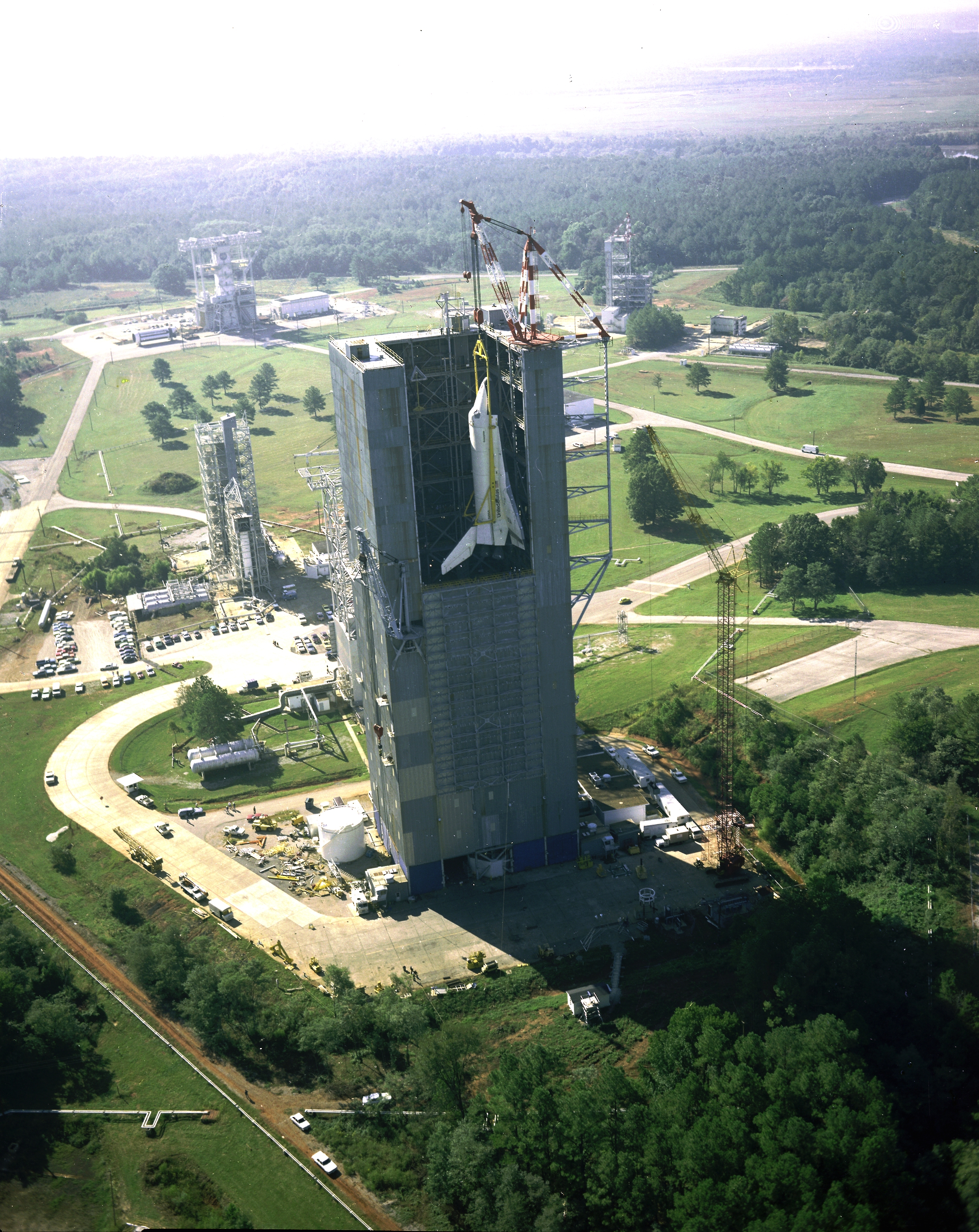
A crane hoists Enterprise into the Dynamic Structural Test Facility to undergo dynamic testing in launch configuration.

=== Mated Vertical Ground Vibration Test (MGVT) ===
Following the conclusion of the ALT test flight program, on March 13, 1978, Enterprise was flown once again, but this time halfway across the country to NASA's Marshall Space Flight Center (MSFC) in Alabama for the Mated Vertical Ground Vibration Testing (MGVT). The orbiter was lifted up on a sling very similar to the one used at Kennedy Space Center and placed inside the Dynamic Test Stand building, and mated to the Vertical Mate Ground Vibration Test tank (VMGVT-ET), which in turn was attached to a set of inert Solid Rocket Boosters (SRB) to form a complete shuttle launch stack, and marked the first time in the program's history that all Space Shuttle elements, an Orbiter, an External Tank (ET), and two SRBs, were mated together. During the course of the program, Enterprise and the rest of the launch stack would be exposed to a punishing series of vibration tests simulating as closely as possible those expected during various phases of launch, some tests with and others without the SRBs in place.

=== Planned preparations for spaceflight ===
At the conclusion of this testing, Enterprise was due to be taken back to Palmdale for retrofitting as a fully spaceflight capable vehicle. Under this arrangement, Enterprise would be launched on its maiden spaceflight in July 1981 to launch a communications satellite and retrieve the Long Duration Exposure Facility, then planned for a 1980 release on the first operational orbiter, Columbia. Afterward, Enterprise would conduct two Spacelab missions. However, in the period between the rollout of Enterprise and the rollout of Columbia, a number of significant design changes had taken place, particularly with regard to the weight of the fuselage and wings. This meant that retrofitting the prototype would have been a much more expensive process than previously realized, involving the dismantling of the orbiter and the return of various structural sections to subcontractors across the country. As a consequence, NASA made the decision to convert an incomplete Structural Test Article, numbered STA-099, which had been built to undergo a variety of stress tests, into a fully flight-worthy orbiter, which became Challenger.

Planned orbital missions
#	Date	Designation	Launch pad	Notes
1	July 16, 1981	STS-17	39-A	Deployment of Intelsat V satellite and retrieval of Long Duration Exposure Facility
2	September 30, 1981	STS-20	39-A	Spacelab mission
3	November 25, 1981	STS-22	39-A	Spacelab mission

=== Fit checks ===
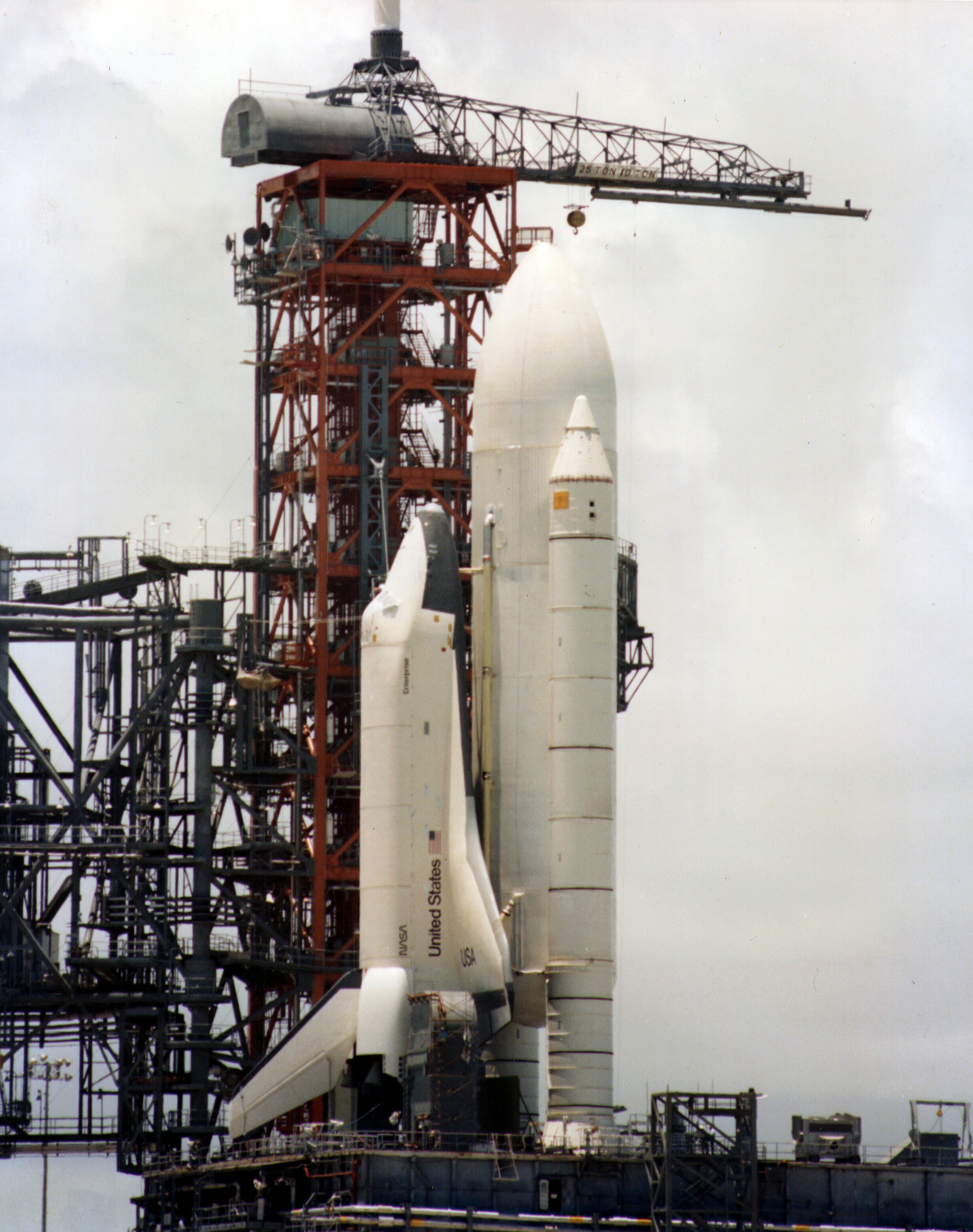
Enterprise visited Kennedy Space Center LC-39A in launch configuration 20 months before the first Shuttle launch.

Following the MGVT program and with the decision to not use Enterprise for orbital missions, it was ferried to Kennedy Space Center on April 10, 1979. By June 1979, it was mated with an external tank and solid rocket boosters (known as a boilerplate configuration) and tested in a launch configuration at KSC Launch Complex 39A for a series of fit checks of the facilities there.

After this period, Enterprise was returned to NASA's Dryden Flight Research Facility in September 1981. In 1983 and 1984, Enterprise underwent an international tour visiting France, West Germany, Italy, the United Kingdom, and Canada. Enterprise also visited California, Alabama, and Louisiana (while visiting the 1984 Louisiana World Exposition).

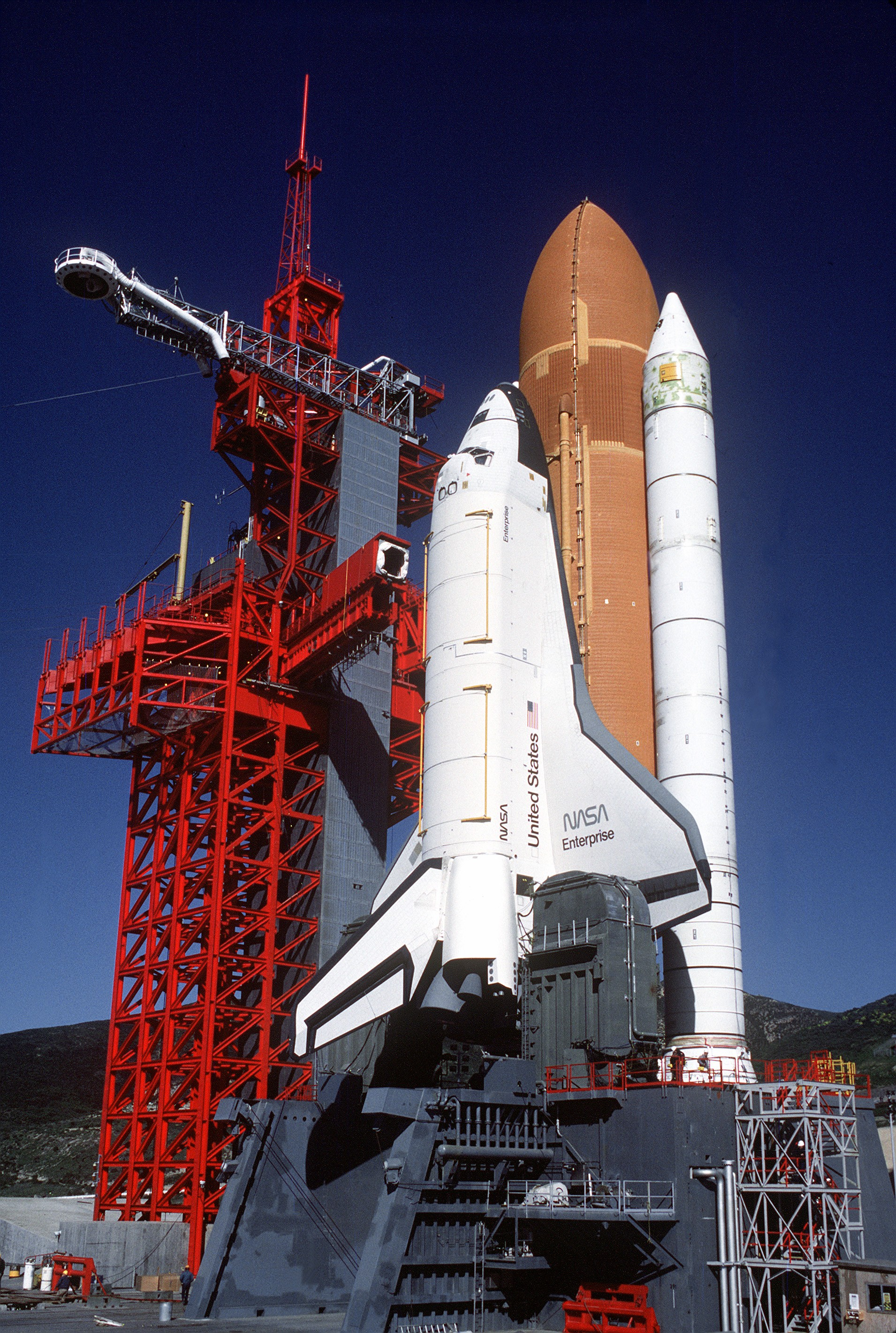
Enterprise visited Vandenberg SLC-6 in launch configuration 17 months before the first West Coast Shuttle launch was scheduled

Between November 1984 and May 1985, Enterprise was again mated with an external tank and solid rocket boosters in a boilerplate configuration for a series of fit checks of the never-used shuttle facilities at Vandenberg Air Force Base in California.

On November 18, 1985, Enterprise was ferried to Washington, D.C., where it became property of the Smithsonian Institution and was stored in the National Air and Space Museum's hangar at Dulles International Airport.

=== Post-Challenger ===
After the Challenger disaster, NASA considered using Enterprise as a replacement. Refitting the shuttle with all of the necessary equipment for it to be used in space was considered, but NASA decided to use spare parts constructed at the same time as Discovery and Atlantis to build Endeavour.

=== Post-Columbia ===
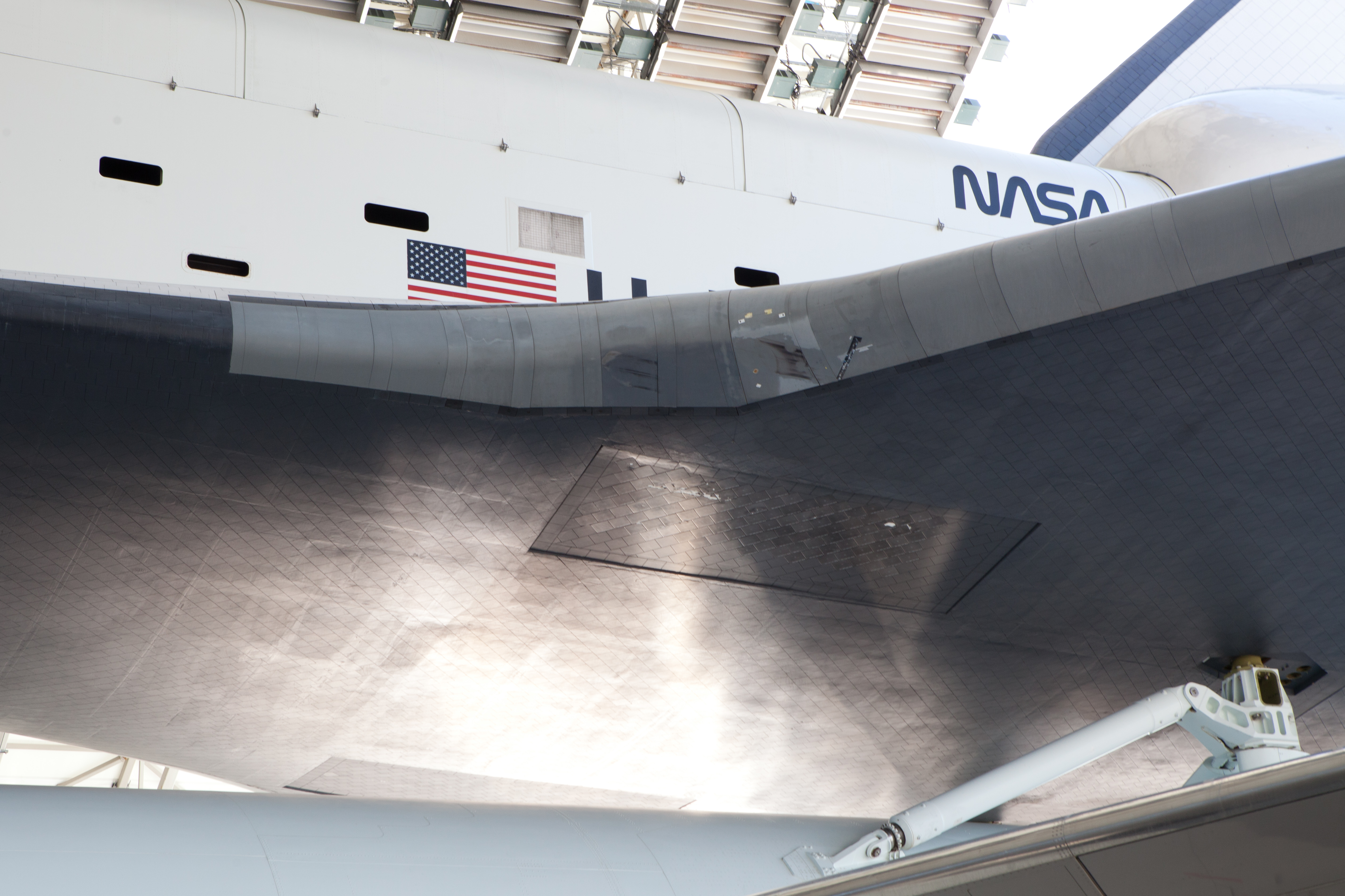
Damage to the leading edge of the wing from the post-Columbia impact tests

In 2003 after the breakup of Columbia during re-entry, the Columbia Accident Investigation Board conducted tests at Southwest Research Institute, which used an air cannon to shoot foam blocks of similar size, mass and speed to that which struck Columbia at a test structure which mechanically replicated the orbiter wing leading edge. They removed a section of fiberglass leading edge from Enterprise's wing to perform analysis of the material and attached it to the test structure, then shot a foam block at it. While the leading edge was not broken as a result of the test, which took place on May 29, 2003, the impact was enough to permanently deform a seal and leave a thin gap 22 in (560 mm) long. Since the strength of the reinforced carbon–carbon (RCC) on Columbia is "substantially weaker and less flexible" than the test section from Enterprise, this result suggested that the RCC would have been shattered. A section of RCC leading edge from Discovery was tested on June 6, to determine the effects of the foam on a similarly aged leading edge, resulting in a 3-inch (80 mm) crack on panel 6 and cracking on a T-shaped seal between panels 6 and 7. On July 7, using a leading edge from Atlantis and focused on panel 8 with refined parameters stemming from the Columbia accident investigation, a second test created a ragged hole approximately 16 by 16 inches (400 by 400 mm) in the RCC structure. The tests clearly demonstrated that a foam impact of the type Columbia sustained could seriously breach the protective RCC panels on the wing leading edge.

The board determined that the probable cause of the accident was that the foam impact caused a breach of a reinforced carbon-carbon panel along the leading edge of Columbia's left wing, allowing hot gases generated during re-entry to enter the wing and cause structural collapse. This caused Columbia to tumble out of control, breaking up with the loss of the entire crew.

=== Museum exhibit ===
==== New Orleans, Louisiana ====
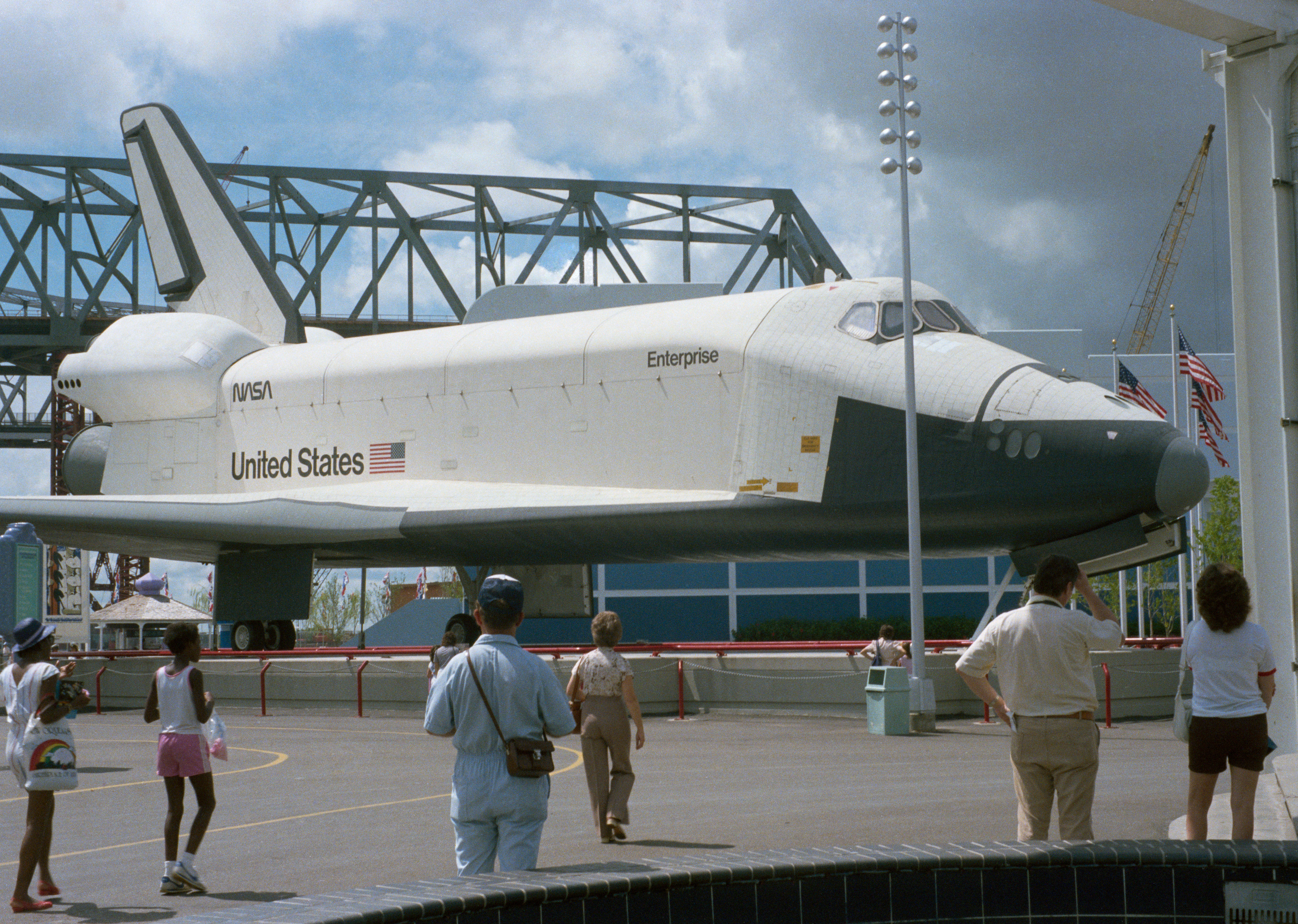
Enterprise on display at the 1984 Louisiana World Exposition in New Orleans.

In 1984, Enterprise was on display during the 1984 Louisiana World Exposition (World's Fair) in New Orleans.

==== Washington, D.C. ====
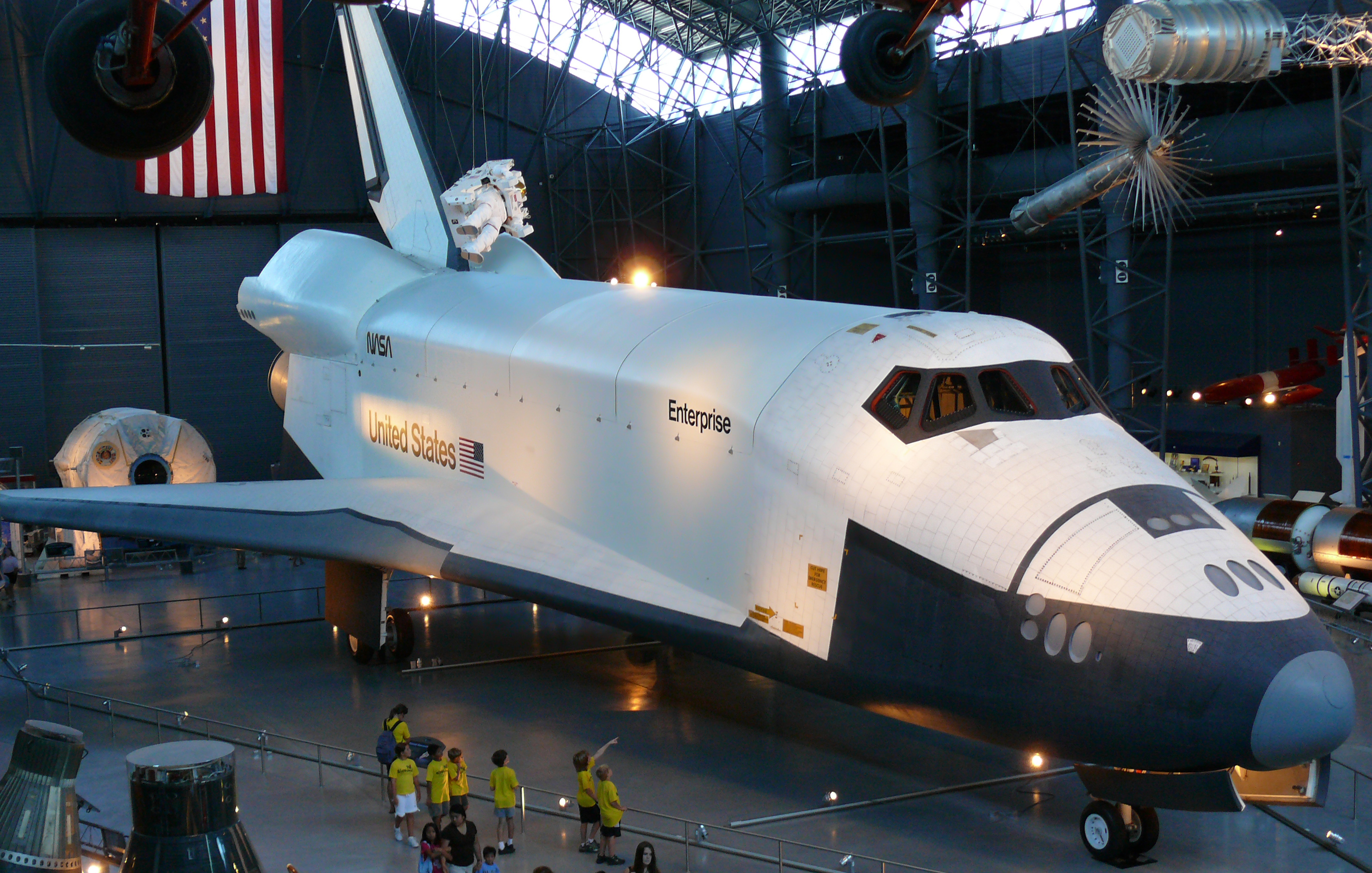
Enterprise on display at the Steven F. Udvar-Hazy Center.

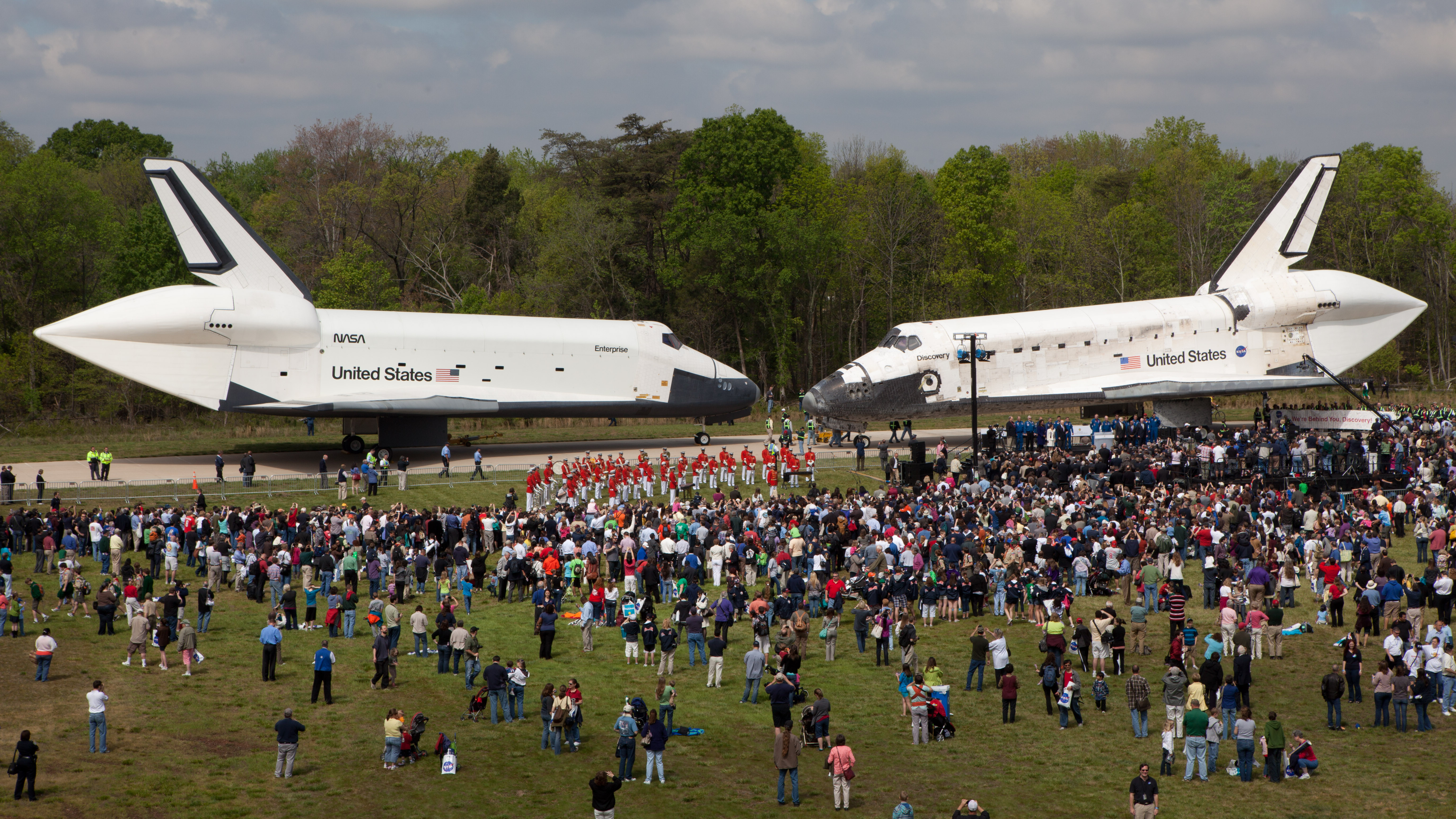
Enterprise (left) stands with Discovery on the latter's delivery to the Smithsonian in Washington D.C.

From 1985 to 2003, Enterprise was stored at the Smithsonian's hangar at Washington Dulles International Airport before it was restored and moved to the Smithsonian's newly built National Air and Space Museum Steven F. Udvar-Hazy Center at Washington Dulles, where it was the centerpiece of the space collection. On April 12, 2011, NASA announced that Discovery, the most traveled orbiter in the fleet, would replace Enterprise in the Smithsonian's collection once the Shuttle fleet was retired, with ownership of Enterprise transferred to the Intrepid Museum in New York City. On April 17, 2012, Discovery was transported by Shuttle Carrier Aircraft to Dulles from Kennedy Space Center, where it made several passes over the Washington D.C. metro area. After Discovery had been removed from the Shuttle Carrier Aircraft, both orbiters were displayed nose-to-nose outside the Steven F. Udvar-Hazy Center before Enterprise was made ready for its flight to New York.

==== New York ====
- Space Shuttle Enterprise
- U.S. National Register of Historic Places
- New York State Register of Historic Places
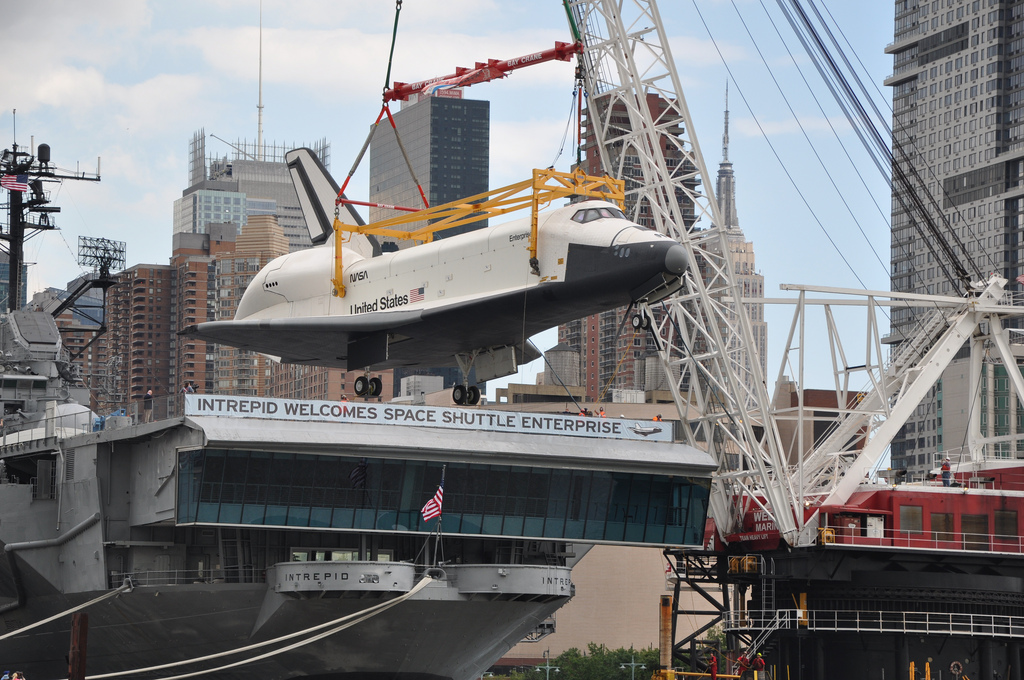
- Enterprise being lifted onto the deck of Intrepid in June 2012

- Location within Manhattan Location within New York City Location within New York Location within the United States
- Location: New York City
- Coordinates: 40°45′55″N 74°00′07″W
- NRHP reference No.: 13000071
- NYSRHP No.: 06101.018471

Significant dates
- Added to NRHP: March 13, 2013
- Designated NYSRHP: January 18, 2013

On December 12, 2011, ownership of Enterprise was officially transferred to the Intrepid Museum in New York City. In preparation for the anticipated relocation, engineers evaluated the vehicle in early 2010 and determined that it was safe to fly on the Shuttle Carrier Aircraft once again. At approximately 13:40 UTC on April 27, 2012, Enterprise took off from Dulles International Airport en route to a fly-by over the Hudson River, New York's JFK International Airport, the Statue of Liberty, the George Washington and Verrazano–Narrows Bridges, and several other landmarks in the city, in an approximately 45-minute "final tour". At 15:23 UTC, Enterprise touched down at JFK International Airport.

The mobile Mate-Demate Device and cranes were transported from Dulles to the ramp at JFK and the shuttle was removed from the SCA overnight on May 12, 2012, placed on a specially designed flat bed trailer and returned to Hangar 12. On June 3 a Weeks Marine barge took Enterprise to Jersey City. The Shuttle sustained cosmetic damage to a wingtip when a gust of wind blew the barge towards a piling. It was hoisted June 6 onto the Intrepid Museum in Manhattan.

Enterprise went on public display on July 19, 2012, at the Intrepid Museum's new Space Shuttle Pavilion, a temporary shelter consisting of a pressurized, air-supported fabric bubble constructed on the aft end of the carrier's flight deck.

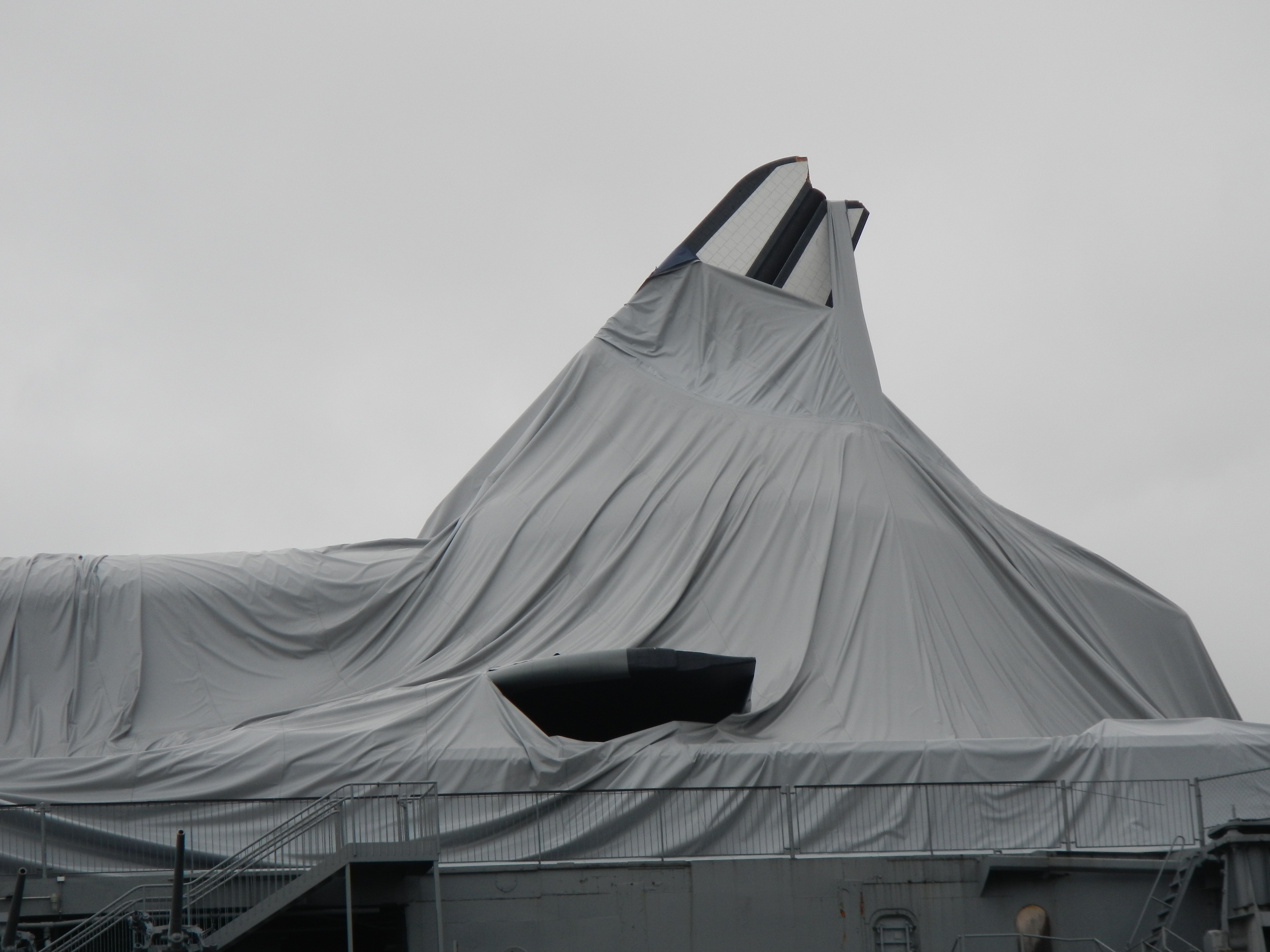
Damage from Hurricane Sandy

On October 29, 2012, storm surges from Hurricane Sandy caused Pier 86, including the Intrepid Museum's visitor center, to flood, and knocked out the museum's electrical power and both backup generators. The loss of power caused the Space Shuttle Pavilion to deflate, and high winds from the hurricane caused the fabric of the Pavilion to tear and collapse around the orbiter. Minor damage was spotted on the vertical stabilizer of the orbiter, as a portion of the tail fin above the rudder/speedbrake had broken off. The broken section was recovered by museum staff. While the pavilion itself could not be replaced for some time in 2013, the museum erected scaffolding and sheeting around Enterprise to protect it from the environment.

By April 2013, the damage sustained to Enterprise's vertical stabilizer had been fully repaired, and construction work on the structure for a new pavilion was under way. The pavilion and exhibit reopened on July 10, 2013.

Enterprise was listed on the National Register of Historic Places on March 13, 2013, reference number 13000071, in recognition of its role in the development of the Space Shuttle Program. The historic significance criteria are in space exploration, transportation, and engineering.

== Gallery ==
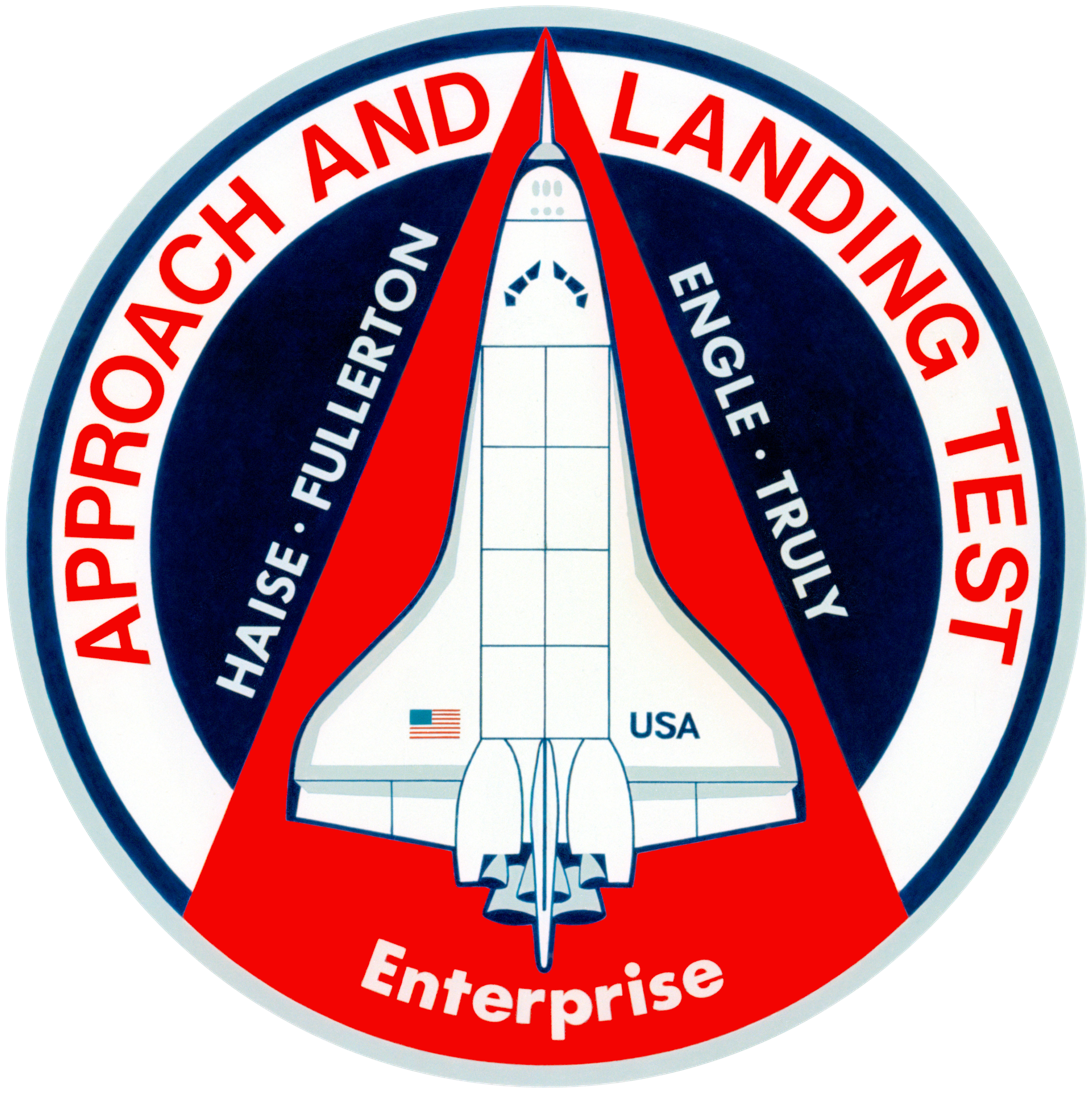
Enterprise ALT program logo

Space Shuttle Enterprise 747 separation

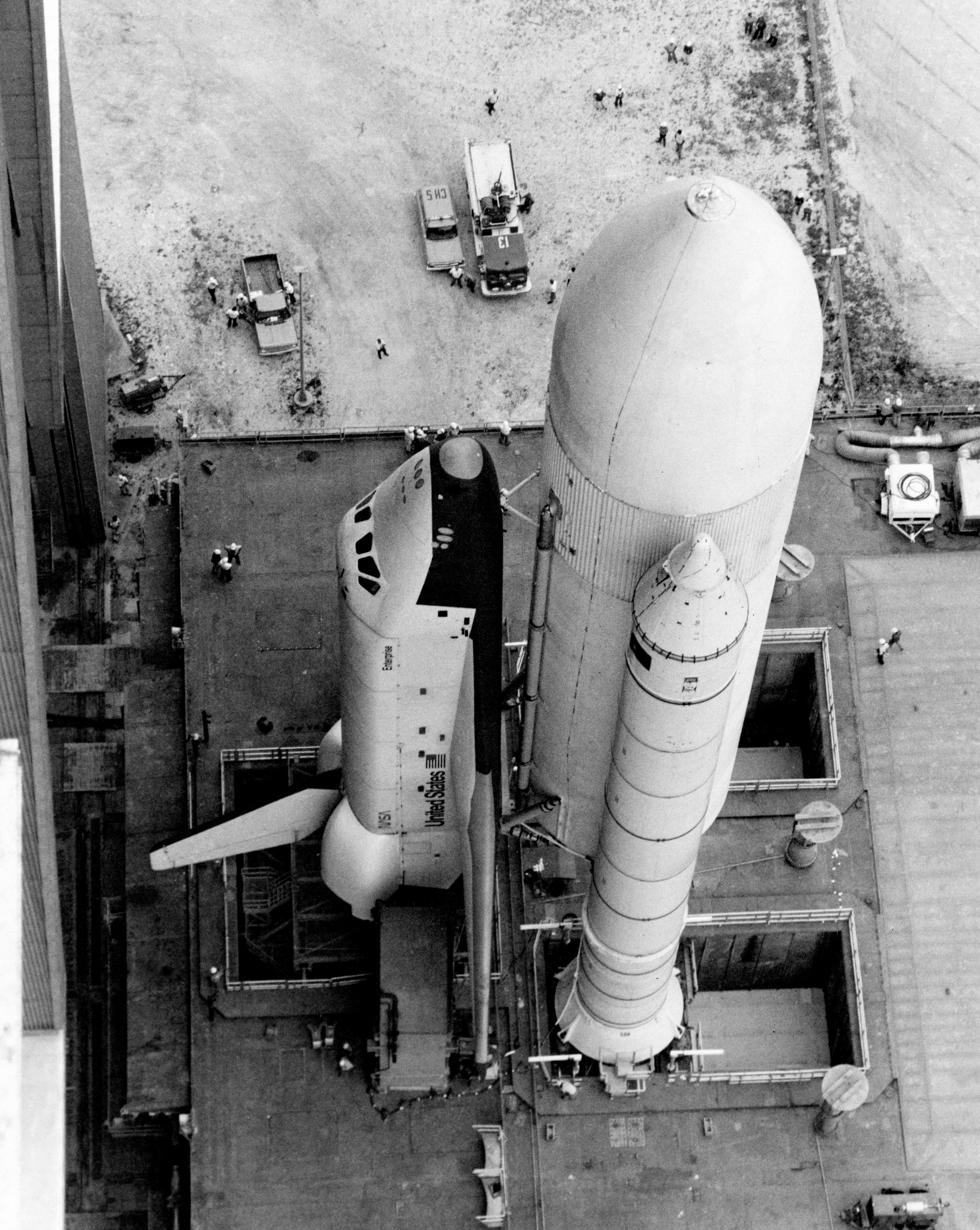
Enterprise makes its first appearance mated with an external tank and SRBs en route to Pad 39A at the Kennedy Space Center

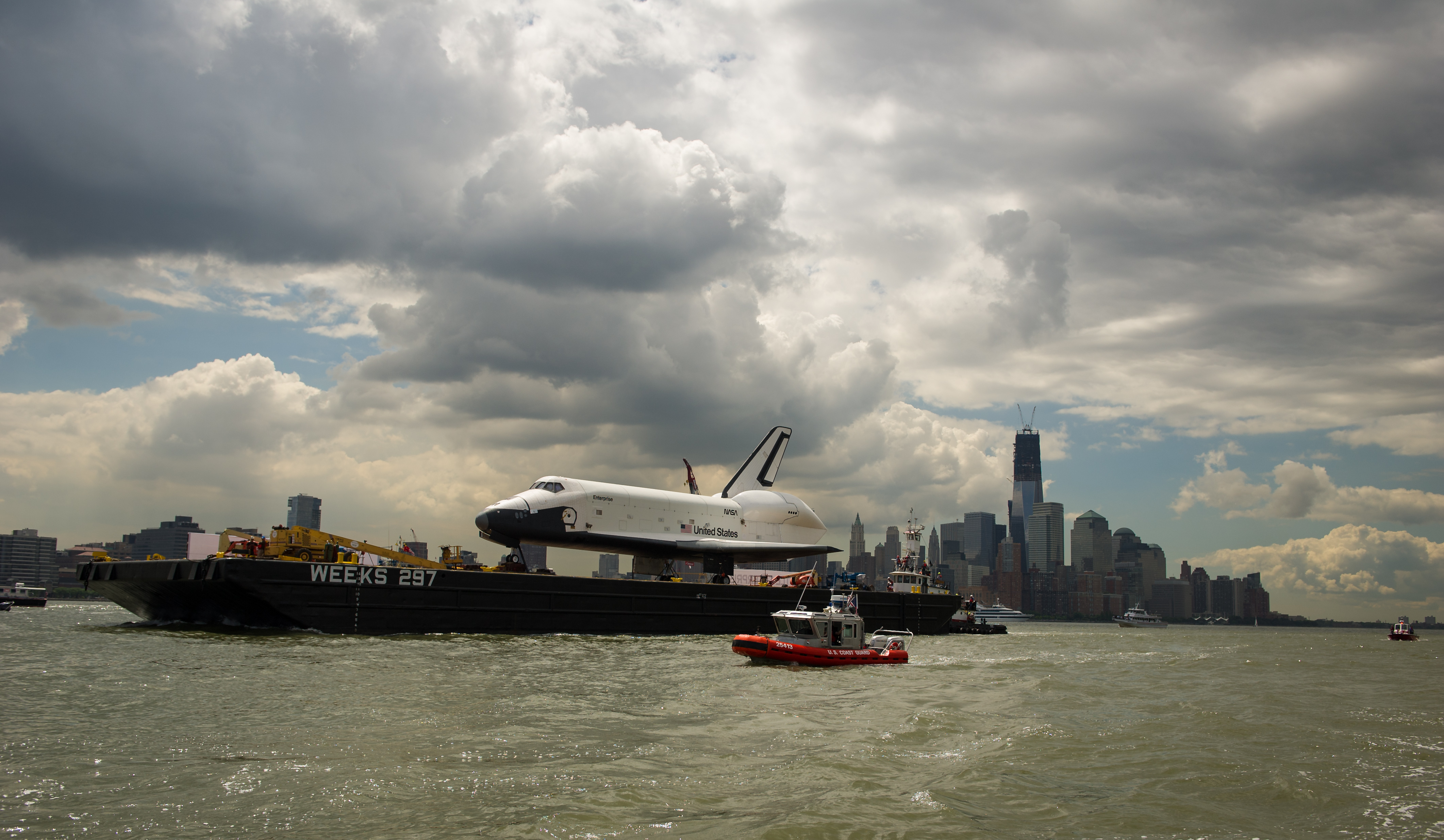
Enterprise en route to its new home aboard USS Intrepid

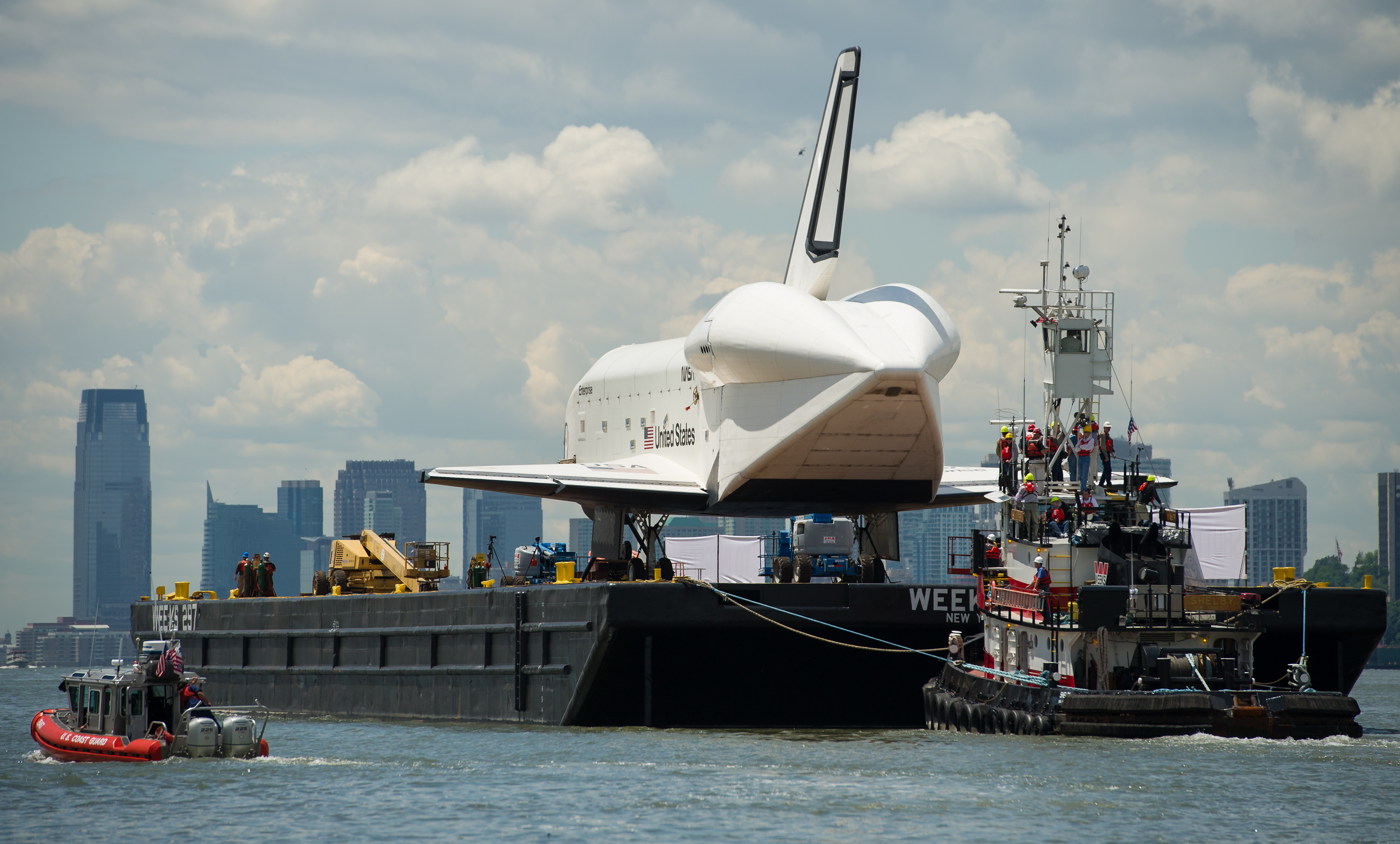
Enterprise underway on the Hudson River

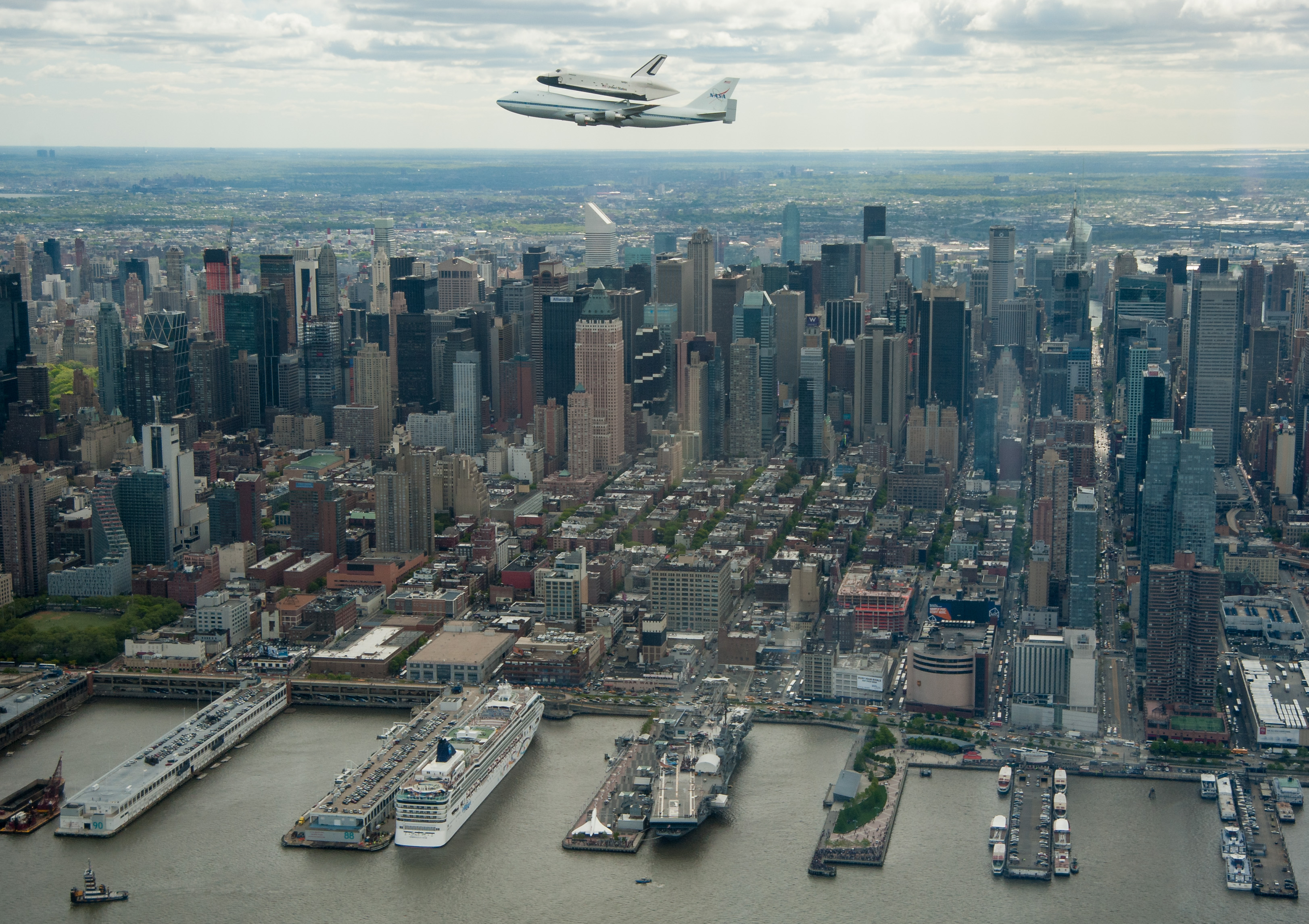
Enterprise over New York. The Intrepid Sea, Air & Space Museum, Enterprise's present home, can be seen below

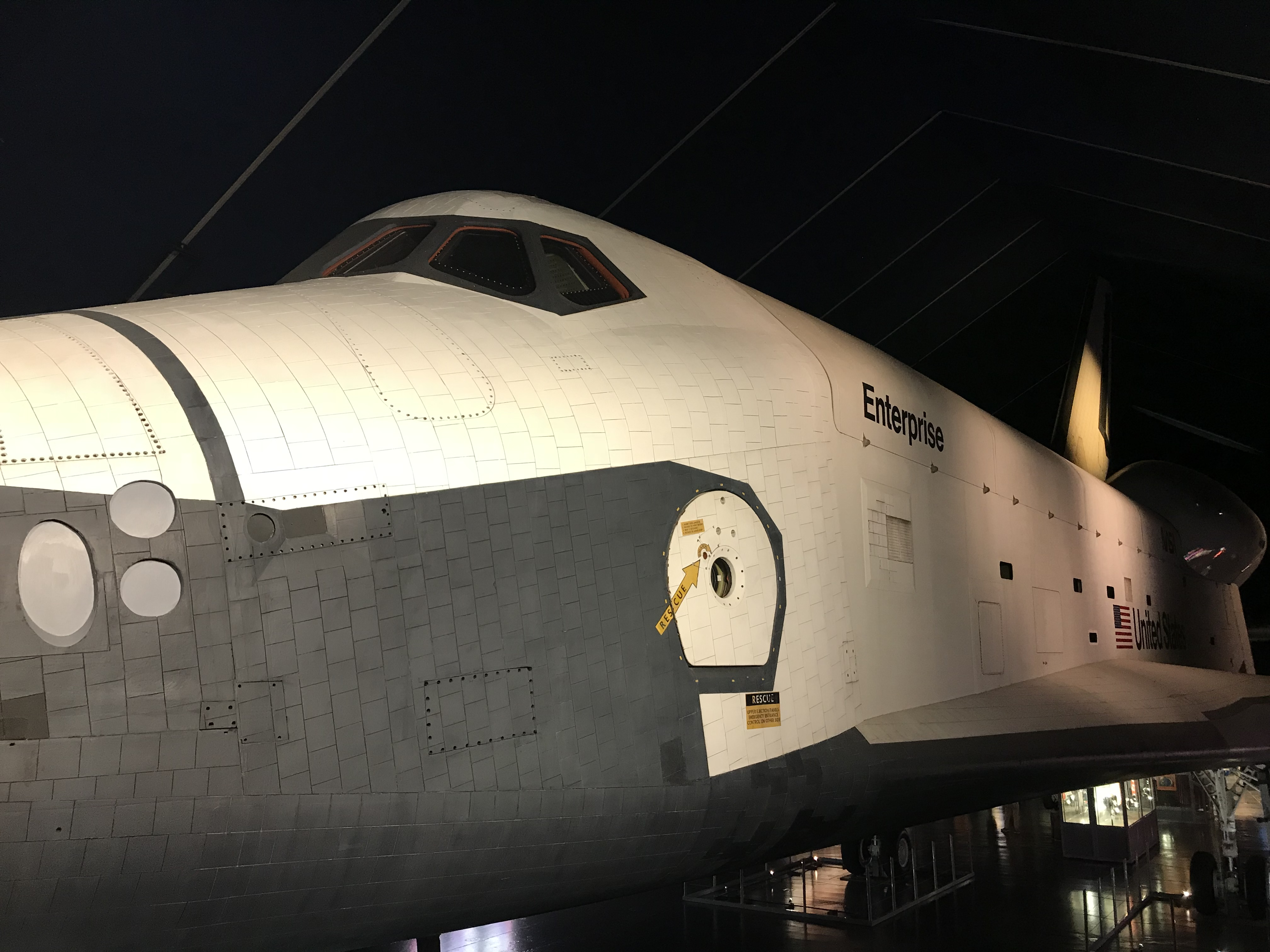
Enterprise at the Intrepid Sea, Air & Space Museum in 2018

== See also ==
- Buran (spacecraft)
- List of human spaceflights
- List of Space Shuttle crews
- List of Space Shuttle missions
- National Register of Historic Places listings in Manhattan from 14th to 59th Streets
- Space Shuttle Pathfinder
- Timeline of Space Shuttle missions
