= WGS-12 =

US military communications satellite

WGS 12
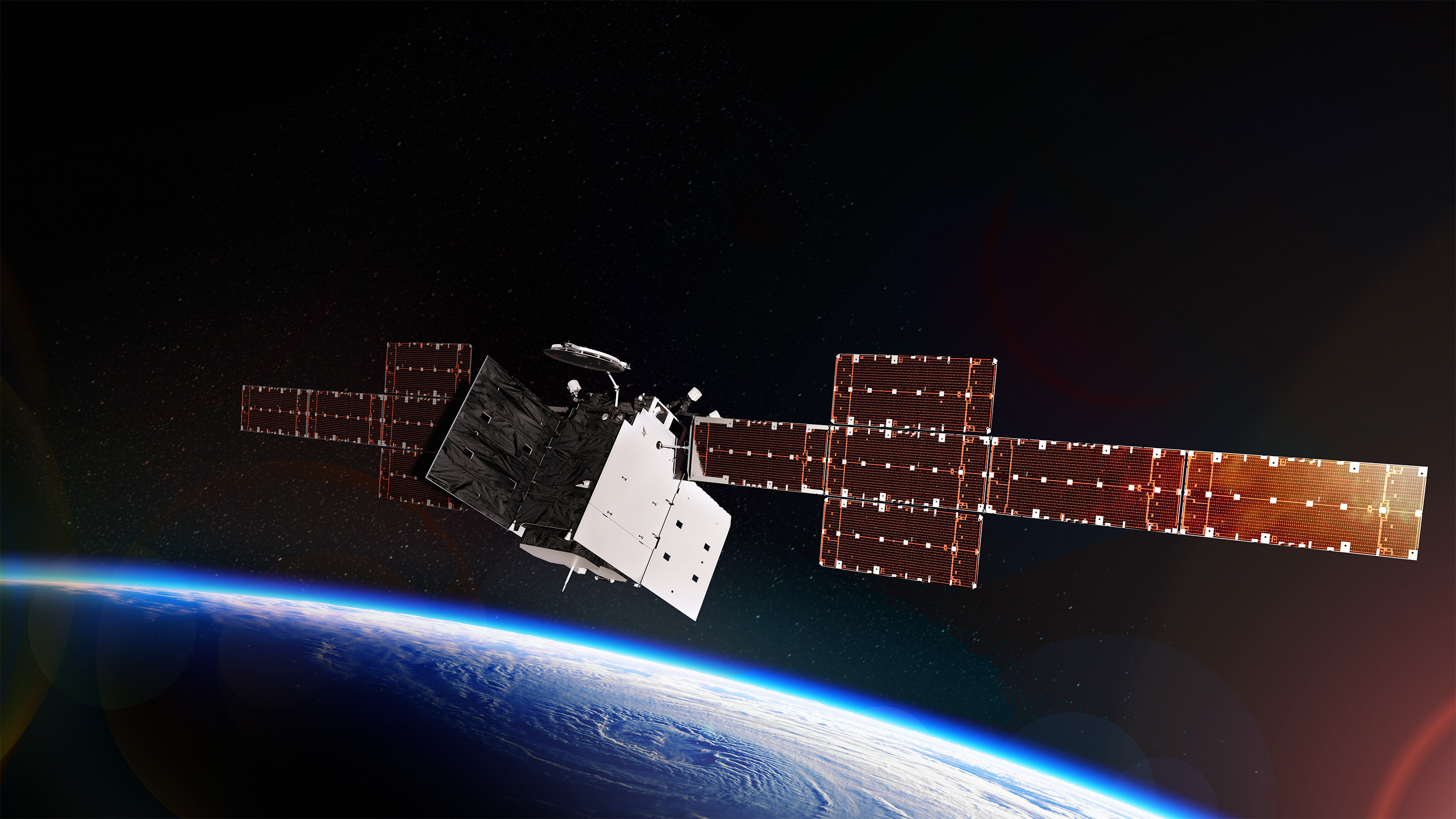
- Artist’s rendering of WGS-12
- Names: WGS SV-12; Wideband Global SATCOM-12
- Mission type: Military communications
- Operator: United States Air Force / United States Space Force
- Mission duration: 14 years (planned)

Spacecraft properties
- Spacecraft: WGS 12
- Spacecraft type: WGS Block II Follow-On
- Bus: BSS-702X
- Manufacturer: Boeing Satellite Systems
- Launch mass: 5,987 kg (13,199 lb)
- Dry mass: 3,000 kg (6,600 lb)
- Power: 11 kW

Start of mission
- Launch date: 2027 (planned)
- Rocket: Falcon Heavy
- Launch site: Kennedy LC-39A
- Contractor: SpaceX

Orbital parameters
- Reference system: Geocentric orbit (planned)
- Regime: Geostationary orbit

Wideband Global SATCOM 12 (WGS 12) is a United States military communications satellite to be operated by the United States Space Force as part of the Wideband Global SATCOM Program. Scheduled for launch in 2027 by a Falcon Heavy rocket into in geostationary orbit, it will be the twelfth WGS satellite. WGS 12 was originally acquired by the United States Air Force.

== Overview ==
The WGS system is composed of three principal segments: the Space Segment (Satellite), the Control (TCT) Segment (operators), and the Terminal Segment (users). Each WGS satellite provides service in multiple frequency bands, with the ability to cross-band between the two frequencies on the satellite. WGS augments other satellites.

In early 2001, a satellite communications industry team led by Hughes (Boeing Satellite Systems) was selected to develop the Wideband Gapfiller Satellite (WGS) system as a successor to the Defense Satellite Communications System (DSCS) series of communications satellites. This satellite communications system is intended to support ground forces. In March 2007, the acronym WGS changed to Wideband Global SATCOM.

One WGS satellite provides more SATCOM capacity than the legacy Defense Satellite Communications System (DSCS) constellation.

== Satellite description ==
In March 2018, the U.S. Congress added US$605 million in funding for two more satellites, WGS 11 and WGS 12. This resulted in the order of WGS 11+ in April 2019 for a 2023 launch. This satellite will be based on the BSS-702X (X=experimental, for experiments, BSS702) variant of Boeing's commercial 702 satellite line, providing improved signal power and bandwidth efficiency compared to earlier WGS satellites. The U.S. Space Force will launch the craft and will perform command & control functions during its 14-year life expectancy.

Built by Boeing Satellite Systems, WGS 11+ is based on the BSS-702X (HS376++) satellite bus. It has a mass at launch of 5,987 kg (13,199 lb) and is expected to operate for fourteen years. The spacecraft is equipped with two solar panels for generate power to its communications payload, which consists of cross-band military X-band, Ka-band transponders, + 10meters solar panels. Propulsion will be provided by an R-4D-15 apogee motor, with four XIPS-25 ion engines for station keeping.

== Launch ==
WGS 12 will launch in 2027 on a Falcon Heavy launch vehicle from Kennedy LC-39A with a mission designation of USSF-206.
