= USA-233 =

US military communications satellite

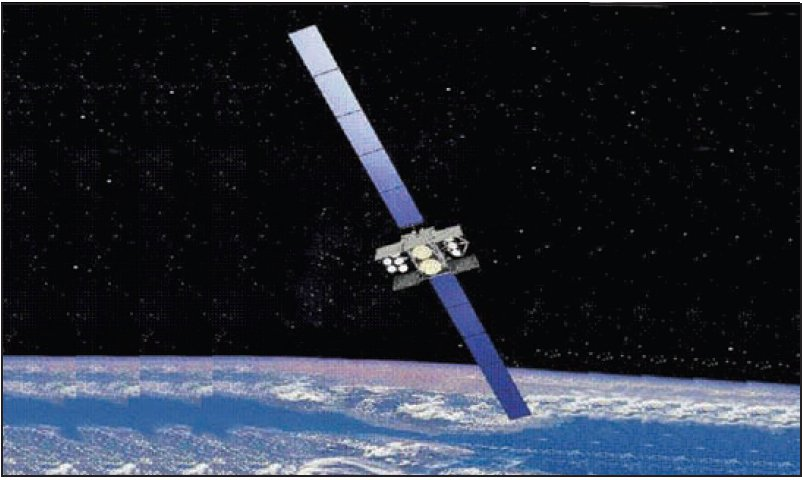
- Artist's impression of a WGS-4 satellite in orbit
- Names: WGS-4; WGS SV-4; Wideband Global SATCOM-4
- Mission type: Military communications
- Operator: United States Air Force / United States Space Force
- COSPAR ID: 2012-003A
- SATCAT no.: 38070
- Website: https://www.spaceforce.mil/
- Mission duration: 14 years (planned); 14 years, 4 months and 11 days (in progress)

Spacecraft properties
- Spacecraft: WGS-4
- Spacecraft type: WGS Block II
- Bus: BSS-702HP
- Manufacturer: Boeing Satellite Systems
- Launch mass: 5,987 kg (13,199 lb)
- Dry mass: 3,000 kg (6,600 lb)
- Power: 11 kW

Start of mission
- Launch date: 20 January 2012, 00:38:00 UTC
- Rocket: Delta IV M+ (5,4) (s/n D358)
- Launch site: Cape Canaveral, SLC-37B
- Contractor: United Launch Alliance

Orbital parameters
- Reference system: Geocentric orbit
- Regime: Geosynchronous orbit
- Longitude: 88.5° East (Indian Ocean)
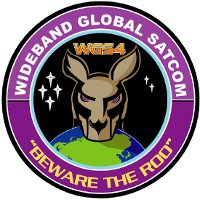
- Wideband Global SATCOM Satellite constellation

USA-233, or Wideband Global SATCOM 4 (WGS-4), is a United States military communications satellite operated by the United States Air Force as part of the Wideband Global SATCOM program, launched in 2012. The fourth Wideband Global SATCOM satellite, it is the first WGS Block II satellite to be launched. It is stationed at 88.5° East (Indian Ocean) in geostationary orbit.

== Overview ==
The Wideband Gapfiller SATCOM (WGS) system is a constellation of military communications satellites. The WGS system is composed of three principal segments: Space Segment (satellites), Control Segment (operators) and Terminal Segment (users). Each WGS satellite provides service in multiple frequency bands, with the ability to cross-band between the two frequencies on board the satellite.

In early 2001, a satellite communications industry team led by Boeing Satellite Systems was selected to develop the WGS system as successors to the Defense Satellite Communications System (DSCS) series of communications satellites. This satellite communications system provides communications for military users and augments the Global Broadcast Service (GBS) and Defense Satellite Communications System (DSCS) satellites already operating. In March 2007, the acronym WGS was changed to Wideband Global SATCOM from Wideband Gapfiller Satellite.

According to the United States Space Force Fact Sheet "Just one WGS satellite provides more SATCOM capacity than the entire legacy Defense Satellite Communications System (DSCS) constellation."

Also, "As the backbone of the U.S. military's global satellite communications, Wideband Global SATCOM Satellite (WGS) system provides flexible, high-capacity communications for the Nation's soldiers through procurement and operation of the satellite constellation and the associated control systems. WGS provides worldwide flexible, high data rate and long haul communications for the Department of Defense (DOD), governmental organizations and international partners."

== Satellite description ==
WGS-4 can transmit data at approximately 3.6 gigabits per second. It can point 19 individual beams at different points on the Earth, operating at X-band and Ka-band frequencies. Built by Boeing Satellite Systems around the BSS-702HP satellite bus, the 5,987 kg (13,199 lb) satellite is expected to operate for fourteen years. Propulsion is provided by a R-4D apogee motor, and four XIPS-25 ion thrusters for stationkeeping. It is valued at US$464 million.

== Launch ==
The launch of WGS-4 took place at 00:38:00 UTC on 20 January 2012, using a Delta IV Medium+ (5,4) launch vehicle flying from Space Launch Complex 37B (SLC-37B) at the Cape Canaveral Air Force Station (CCAFS). The launch was conducted by United Launch Alliance (ULA), and marked the eighteenth flight of the Delta IV. The launch vehicle successfully placed the satellite into a 440 by 66,870 km (270 by 41,550 mi) supersynchronous geostationary transfer orbit, with 24° of inclination. Upon achieving orbit, WGS-4 was assigned its USA designation USA-233, and the International Designator 2012-003A. The satellite used its onboard propulsion systems to inject itself into geosynchronous orbit.
