= USA-275 =

US military communications satellite

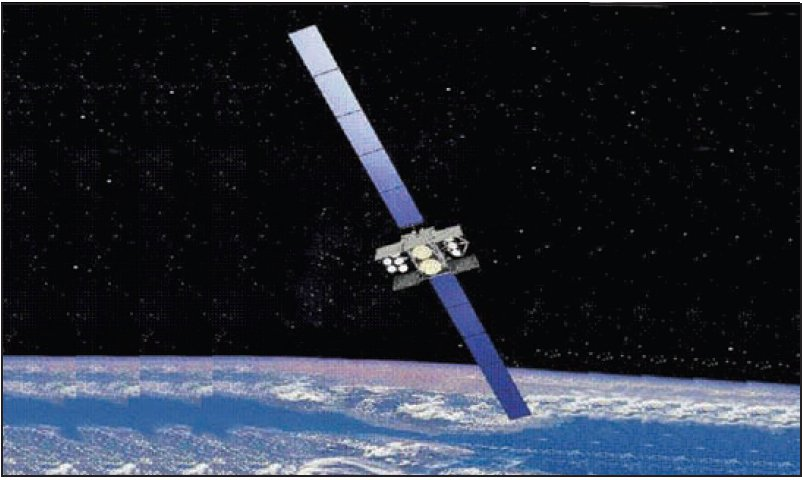
- Artist's impression of a WGS-9 satellite in orbit
- Names: WGS-9; WGS SV-9; Wideband Global SATCOM-9
- Mission type: Military communications
- Operator: United States Air Force / United States Space Force
- COSPAR ID: 2017-016A
- SATCAT no.: 42075
- Website: https://www.spaceforce.mil/
- Mission duration: 14 years (planned); 8 years, 7 months and 17 days (in progress)

Spacecraft properties
- Spacecraft: WGS-9
- Spacecraft type: WGS Block II Follow-On
- Bus: BSS-702HP
- Manufacturer: Boeing Satellite Systems
- Launch mass: 5,987 kg (13,199 lb)
- Dry mass: 3,000 kg (6,600 lb)
- Power: 11 kW

Start of mission
- Launch date: 19 March 2017, 00:18:00 UTC
- Rocket: Delta IV M+ (5,4) (s/n D377)
- Launch site: Cape Canaveral, SLC-37B
- Contractor: United Launch Alliance

Orbital parameters
- Reference system: Geocentric orbit
- Regime: Geostationary orbit

Transponders
- Band: X-band and Ka-band (enhanced)
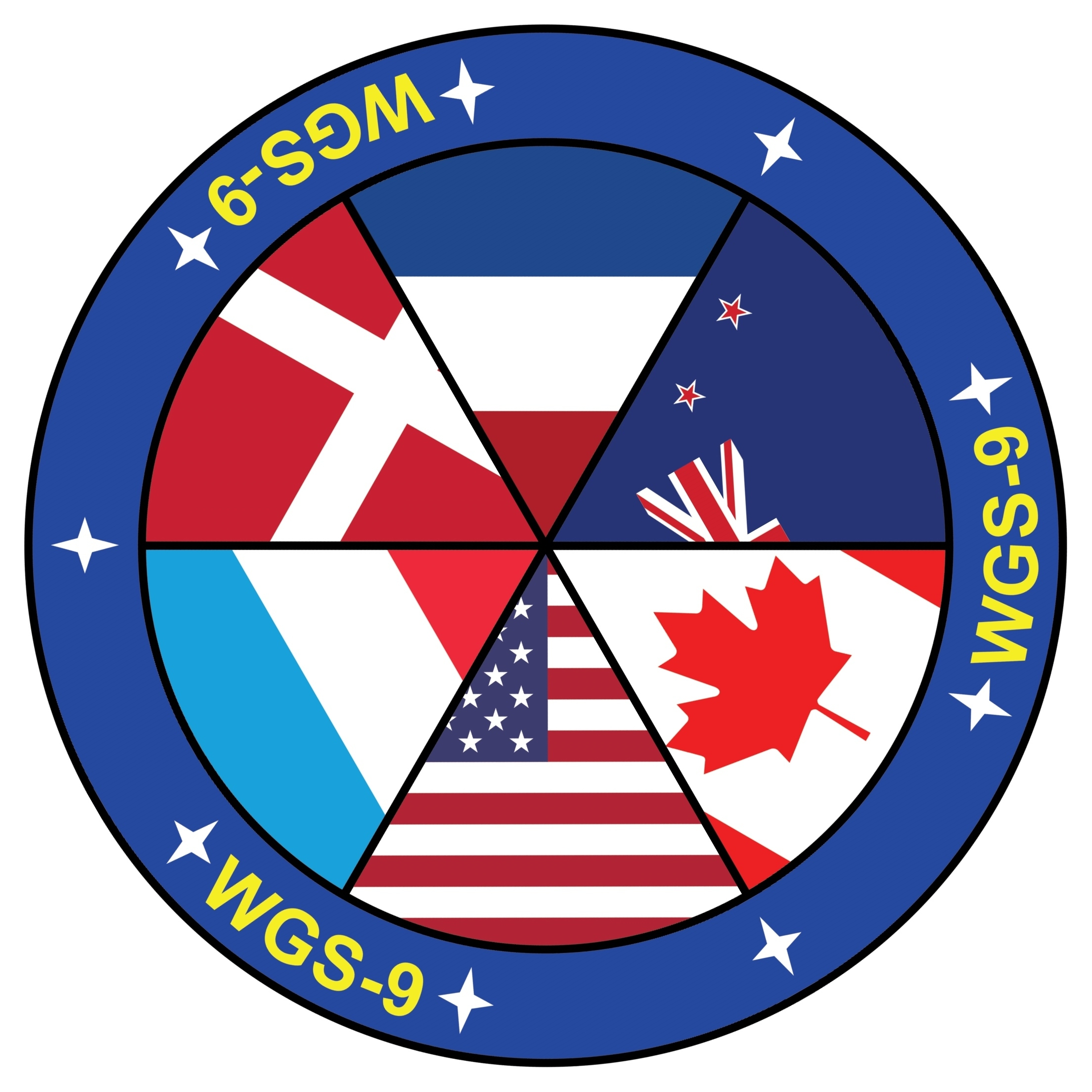
- Wideband Global SATCOM Satellite constellation

USA-275, or Wideband Global SATCOM 9 (WGS-9) is a United States military communications satellite operated by the United States Air Force as part of the Wideband Global SATCOM programme. Launched in 2017, it was the ninth WGS satellite to reach orbit. It is stationed at a longitude of 135° West, in geostationary orbit. WGS-9 was procured by the United States Air Force.

== Overview ==
The WGS system is a constellation of highly capable military communications satellites that leverage cost-effective methods and technological advances in the communications satellite industry. The WGS system is composed of three principal segments: Space Segment (satellites), Control Segment (operators) and Terminal Segment (users). Each WGS satellite provides service in multiple frequency bands, with the unprecedented ability to cross-band between the two frequencies on board the satellite. WGS augments other satellites.

In early 2001, a satellite communications industry team led by Boeing Satellite Systems was selected to develop the Wideband Gapfiller Satellite (WGS) system as successors to the Defense Satellite Communications System (DSCS) series of communications satellites. This satellite communications system is intended to support the warfighter with newer and far greater capabilities than provided by current systems. In March 2007, the acronym WGS was changed to Wideband Global SATCOM.

Just one WGS satellite provides more SATCOM capacity than the entire legacy Defense Satellite Communications System (DSCS) constellation.

As the backbone of the U.S. military's global satellite communications, Wideband Global SATCOM (WGS) satellite system provides flexible, high-capacity communications for the Nation's warfighters through procurement and operation of the satellite constellation and the associated control systems. WGS provides worldwide flexible, high data rate and long haul communications for the Department of Defense (DoD), governmental organizations and international partners.

== Satellite description ==
WGS-9 has been funded by Canada, Denmark, the Netherlands, Luxembourg, New Zealand and United States. The U.S. Air Force is launching the craft and will perform the command-and-control functions during its 14-year life expectancy. Built by Boeing Satellite Systems, WGS-9 is based on the BSS-702HP satellite bus. It had a mass at launch of 5,987 kg (13,199 lb), and was expected to operate for fourteen years. The spacecraft is equipped with two solar panels to generate power for its communications payload, which consists of cross-band X-band and Ka-band transponders. Propulsion is provided by an R-4D-15 apogee motor, with four XIPS-25 ion engines for stationkeeping. The agreement of Canada, Denmark, Luxembourg, the Netherlands and New Zealand to invest a combined US$620 million in a ninth WGS satellite over 20 years — the U.S. Air Force will finance the rest of the billion-dollar WGS-9 program.

== Launch ==
WGS-9 was launched by United Launch Alliance (ULA), who placed it into orbit using a Delta IV M+ (5,4) launch vehicle, flight number D377. The launch took place from Space Launch Complex 37B (SLC-37B) at the Cape Canaveral Air Force Station (CCAFS), with liftoff at 00:18:00 UTC on 19 March 2017. The launch was successful, placing the WGS-9 into a geostationary transfer orbit (GTO), from which the spacecraft raised itself into geostationary orbit using its onboard propulsion system. The satellite was designated USA-275 under the U.S. military's designation system, and received the International Designator 2017-016A and Satellite Catalog Number 42075.
