= USA-211 =

US military communications satellite

USA 211
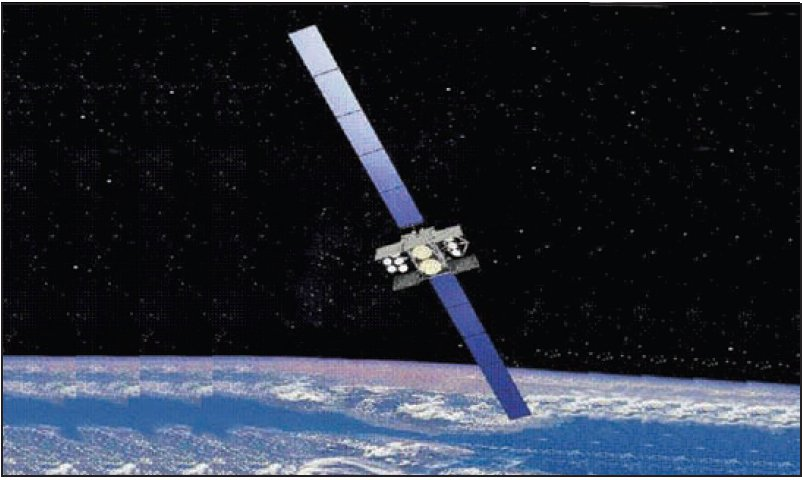
- Artist's impression of a WGS-3 satellite in orbit
- Names: WGS 3 WGS SV-3; Wideband Global SATCOM-3
- Mission type: Military communications
- Operator: United States Air Force / United States Space Force
- COSPAR ID: 2009-068A
- SATCAT no.: 36108
- Website: https://www.spaceforce.mil/
- Mission duration: 14 years (planned); 15 years, 7 months and 5 days (in progress)

Spacecraft properties
- Spacecraft: WGS F3
- Spacecraft type: WGS Block I
- Bus: BSS-702
- Manufacturer: Boeing Satellite Systems
- Launch mass: 5,987 kg (13,199 lb)

Start of mission
- Launch date: 05December 2009, 20:47ET., 6 December 2009, 01:47:00 UTC
- Rocket: Delta IV M+ (5,4)
- Launch site: Cape Canaveral, SLC-37B
- Contractor: United Launch Alliance

Orbital parameters
- Reference system: Geocentric orbit
- Regime: Geostationary orbit
- Longitude: 12° West (Atlantic Ocean)
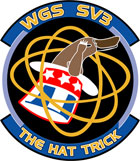
- Wideband Global SATCOM Satellite constellation

USA 211, or Wideband Global SATCOM 3 (WGS F3) is a United States military communications satellite operated by the United States Air Force as part of the Wideband Global SATCOM programme. Launched in 2009, it was the third WGS satellite, and final Block I satellite, to reach orbit. It was originally stationed in geostationary orbit at 12° West (Atlantic Ocean).

== Overview ==
The WGS system is a constellation of highly capable military communications satellites that leverage cost-effective methods and technological advances in the communications satellite industry. The WGS system is composed of three principal segments: Space Segment (satellites), Control Segment (operators) and Terminal Segment (users). Each WGS satellite provides service in multiple frequency bands, with the unprecedented ability to cross-band between the two frequencies on board the satellite. WGS augments other satellites.

In early 2001, a satellite communications industry team led by Boeing Satellite Systems was selected to develop the Wideband Gapfiller Satellite (WGS) system as successors to the Defense Satellite Communications System (DSCS) series of communications satellites. This satellite communications system is intended to support the warfighter with newer and far greater capabilities than provided by current systems. In March 2007, the acronym WGS was changed to Wideband Global SATCOM.

Just one WGS satellite provides more SATCOM capacity than the entire legacy Defense Satellite Communications System (DSCS) constellation.

== Satellite description ==
Built by Boeing Satellite Systems, WGS F3 is based on the BSS-702 satellite bus. It had a mass at launch of 5,987 kg (13,199 lb), and was expected to operate for fourteen years (to 2023]). The satellite is equipped with two solar arrays to generate power for its communications payload, which consists of military cross-band X-band and Ka-band transponders.

Propulsion is provided by a R-4D-15 apogee motor, with four XIPS-25 ion engines for stationkeeping.

== Launch ==
WGS F3 was launched by United Launch Alliance (ULA), who placed it into orbit using a U.S.Con. Delta IV launch vehicle, which flew for the first time in the Medium+ (5,4) configuration. The launch took place from Space Launch Complex 37B (SLC-37B) at the Cape Canaveral Air Force Station (CCAFS), with at 01:47:00 UTC on 6 December 2009 (5 December 2023, 20:47ET). The launch was successful, placing the satellite into a geostationary transfer orbit (GTO), from which it raised itself into geostationary orbit using its propulsion system. Following launch, the satellite was designated USA 211 under the U.S. military's designation system, and received the International Designator 2009-068A and Satellite Catalog Number 36108.

== Location ==
- 12° West (Atlantic Ocean)
- 121.8°W(06/2021-11/2021)
- 179.8°E (12/2021-03/2022)
- 85.7°E (04/2022-07/2022)
- 78.1°E (08/2022-11/2022)
- 24.0°E (12/2022-03/2023)
- 42.8°W i=0.2° (04/2023-10/2023])
