= USA-195 =

US military communications satellite

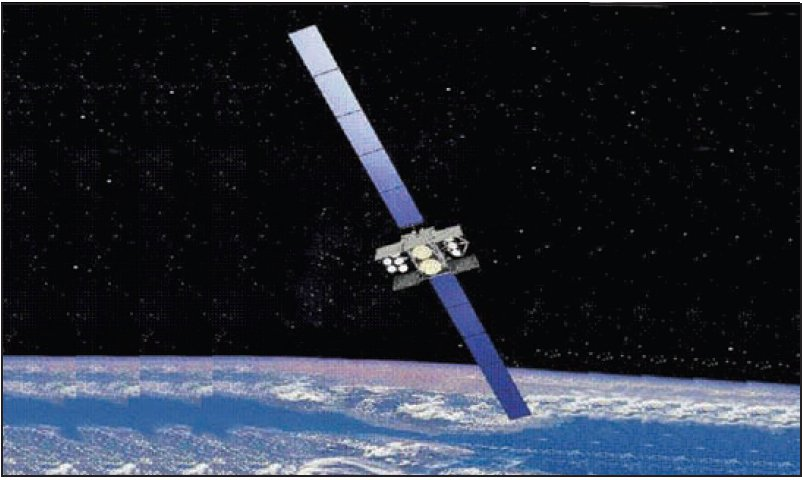
- Artist's impression of a WGS-1 satellite in orbit
- Names: WGS-1; WGS SV-1; Wideband Global SATCOM-1
- Mission type: Military communications
- Operator: United States Air Force / United States Space Force
- COSPAR ID: 2007-046A
- SATCAT no.: 32258
- Website: https://www.spaceforce.mil/
- Mission duration: 14 years (planned); 17 years, 4 months and 22 days (in progress)

Spacecraft properties
- Spacecraft: WGS-1
- Spacecraft type: WGS Block I
- Bus: BSS-702
- Manufacturer: Boeing Satellite Systems
- Launch mass: 5,987 kg (13,199 lb)

Start of mission
- Launch date: 11 October 2007, 00:22 UTC
- Rocket: Atlas V 421 (AV-011)
- Launch site: Cape Canaveral, SLC-41
- Contractor: United Launch Alliance

Orbital parameters
- Reference system: Geocentric orbit
- Regime: Geostationary orbit
- Longitude: 174.8° East (Ocean Pacific)
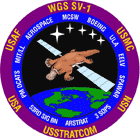
- Wideband Global SATCOM Satellite constellation

USA-195, or Wideband Global SATCOM 1 (WGS-1) is a United States military communications satellite operated by the United States Air Force as part of the Wideband Global SATCOM programme. Launched in 2007, it was the first WGS satellite to reach orbit. It is stationed at a longitude of 174.8° East (Ocean Pacific).

== Overview ==
The WGS system is a constellation of highly capable military communications satellites that leverage cost-effective methods and technological advances in the communications satellite industry. The WGS system is composed of three principal segments: Space Segment (satellites), Control Segment (operators) and Terminal Segment (users). Each WGS satellite provides service in multiple frequency bands, with the unprecedented ability to cross-band between the two frequencies on board the satellite. WGS augments other satellites.

In early 2001, a satellite communications industry team led by Boeing Satellite Systems was selected to develop the Wideband Gapfiller Satellite (WGS) system as successors to the Defense Satellite Communications System (DSCS) series of communications satellites. This satellite communications system is intended to support the warfighter with newer and far greater capabilities than provided by current systems. In March 2007, the acronym WGS was changed to Wideband Global SATCOM.

Just one WGS satellite provides more SATCOM capacity than the entire legacy Defense Satellite Communications System (DSCS) constellation.

== Satellite description ==
Built by Boeing, USA-195 is based on the BSS-702 satellite bus. It had a mass at launch of 5,987 kg (13,199 lb), and was expected to operate for fourteen years. The satellite is equipped with two solar arrays to generate power for its communications payload, which consists of cross-band X-band and Ka-band transponders. Propulsion is provided by an R-4D-15 apogee motor, with four XIPS-25 ion engines for stationkeeping.

== Launch ==
WGS-1 was launched by United Launch Alliance (ULA), who placed it into orbit using an Atlas V launch vehicle flying in the 421 configuration. The launch took place from Space Launch Complex 41 at the Cape Canaveral Air Force Station (CCAFS), with liftoff occurring at 00:22 UTC on 11 October 2007. The launch was successful, placing the satellite into a geosynchronous transfer orbit (GTO), from which the spacecraft raised itself into geostationary orbit using its onboard propulsion systems. The satellite was designated USA-195 under the U.S. military's designation system, and received the International Designator 2007-046A and Satellite Catalog Number 32258.
