= USA-243 =

US military communications satellite

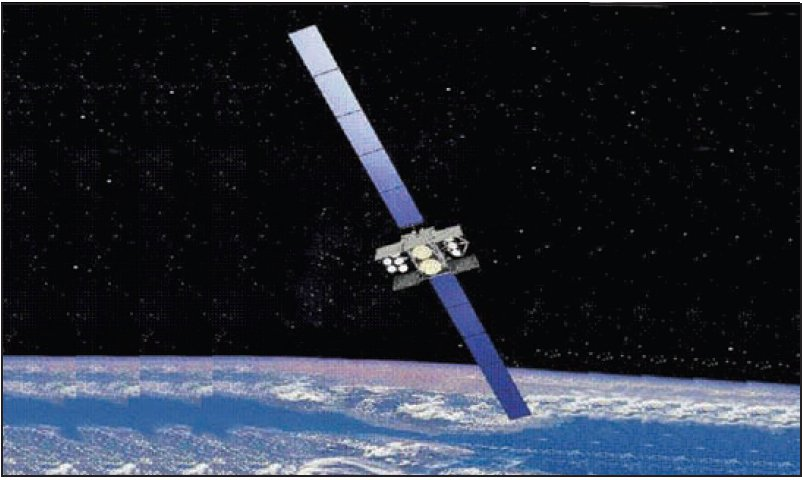
- Artist's impression of a WGS-5 satellite in orbit
- Names: WGS-5; WGS SV-5; Wideband Global SATCOM-5
- Mission type: Military communications
- Operator: United States Air Force / United States Space Force
- COSPAR ID: 2013-024A
- SATCAT no.: 39168
- Website: https://www.spaceforce.mil/
- Mission duration: 14 years (planned); 12 years, 9 months and 27 days (in progress)

Spacecraft properties
- Spacecraft: WGS-5
- Spacecraft type: WGS Block II
- Bus: BSS-702HP
- Manufacturer: Boeing Satellite Systems
- Launch mass: 5,987 kg (13,199 lb)
- Dry mass: 3,000 kg (6,600 lb)
- Power: 11 kW

Start of mission
- Launch date: 25 May 2013, 00:27 UTC
- Rocket: Delta IV M+ (5,4) (s/n D362)
- Launch site: Cape Canaveral, SLC-37B
- Contractor: United Launch Alliance

Orbital parameters
- Reference system: Geocentric orbit
- Regime: Geostationary orbit
- Longitude: 52.5° West (Contiguous United States)

Transponders
- Band: X-band and Ka-band
- Frequency: 7.2/8.4 GHz (X-band) 30/20 GHz (Ka-band)
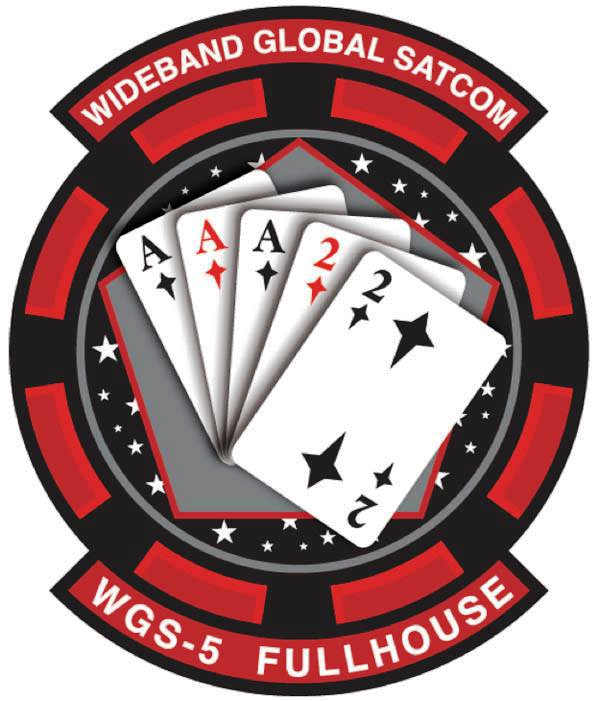
- Wideband Global SATCOM Satellite constellation

USA-243, also known as WGS-5, is a United States military communications satellite. It was the fifth satellite to be launched as part of the Wideband Global SATCOM program and the second Block II satellite.

== Overview ==
The WGS system is a system of military communications satellites that use cost-effective methods and technological advances in the communications satellite industry. The WGS system is composed of three principal segments: Space Segment (satellites), Control Segment (operators), and Terminal Segment (users). Each WGS satellite provides service in multiple frequency bands, with the ability to cross-band between the two frequencies on board the satellite. WGS augments other satellites.

In early 2001, a satellite communications industry team led by Boeing Satellite Systems was selected to develop the Wideband Gapfiller Satellite (WGS) system as a successor to the Defense Satellite Communications System (DSCS) series of communications satellites. It is intended to support the U.S. Armed Forces with greater capabilities than those provided by other systems. In March 2007, the acronym WGS was changed to Wideband Global SATCOM.

A major part of the U.S. military's global satellite communications, the Wideband Global SATCOM Satellite (WGS) system helps the U.S. Military through the operation of the control systems and provides long haul communications for the Department of Defense.

== Satellite description ==
WGS-5 is based on the BSS-702HP satellite bus. It has a mass of 5,987 kg (13,199 lb) and a design life of fourteen years. Its two solar panels generate upwards of 11 kW of power. The satellite is equipped with X-band and Ka-band transponders. A R-4D bi-propellant rocket motor and four XIPS-25 ion engines provide propulsion for maneuvering.

== Launch ==
WGS-5 was launched by the United Launch Alliance on a Delta IV M+ (5,4) launch vehicle, named Delta 362, from the Space Launch Complex (SLC-37B) at the Cape Canaveral Air Force Station (CCAFS) at 00:27 UTC on 25 May 2013. The satellite was placed into a supersynchronous transfer orbit. From there, the satellite was maneuvered into geostationary orbit.

A launch attempt 24 hours before was aborted due to a problem with a helium pressurization line. The launch was successful.
