= Wideband Global SATCOM =

Defense satellite communications project

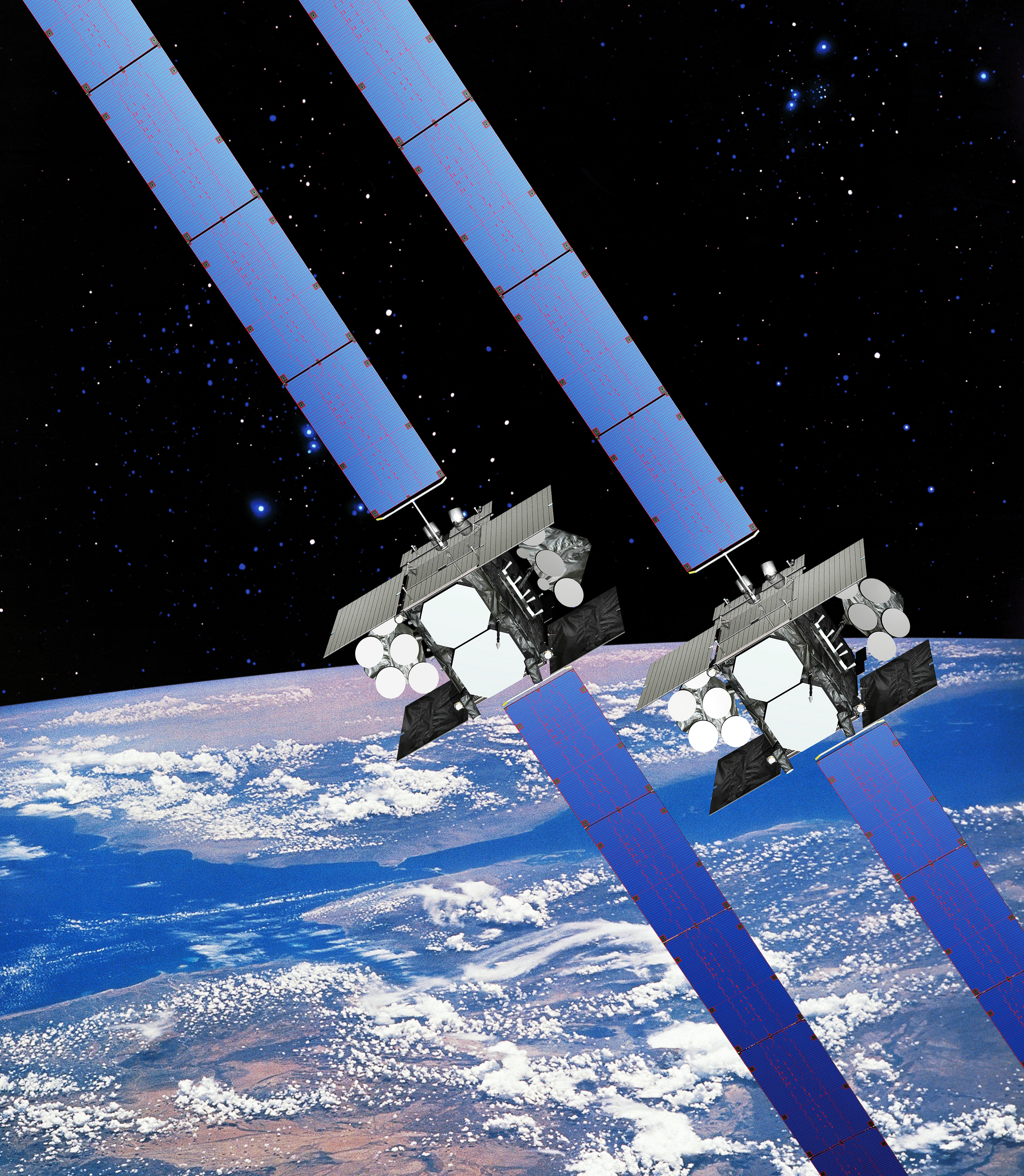
Illustration of the WGS satellites in its two configurations, known as Block I (left) and Block II (right)

The Wideband Global SATCOM system (WGS) is a high capacity United States Space Force satellite communications system planned for use in partnership by the United States Department of Defense (DoD), Canadian Department of National Defence (DND) and the Australian Department of Defence. The system is composed of the Space Segment satellites, the Terminal Segment users and the Control Segment operators.

DoD wideband satellite communication services are currently provided by a combination of the existing Defense Satellite Communications System (DSCS) and Global Broadcast Service (GBS) satellites. According to United Launch Alliance, quoted on Spaceflight Now, "A single WGS spacecraft has as much bandwidth as the entire existing DSCS constellation." WGS operations are currently run by the 4th Space Operations Squadron, out of Schriever Space Force Base, as well as the 53rd Space Operations Squadron.

== Mission ==
The constellation of WGS satellites increases the communications capabilities of the militaries of the United States, Canada, and Australia by providing additional bandwidth and communications capabilities for tactical command and control, communications, and computers; intelligence, surveillance, and reconnaissance (C4ISR); battle management; and combat support information. Canada has also signed on to become a partner.

WGS also augments the current Ka-band Global Broadcast Service (on UHF F/O satellites) by providing additional information broadcast capabilities as well as providing new two-way capability on that band. It provides services to the US DoD and Australian Department of Defence. The IWS System supports continuous 24-hour-per-day wideband satellite services to tactical users and some fixed infrastructure users. Limited protected services will be provided under conditions of stress to selected users employing terrestrial modems capable of providing protection against jamming.

== Capabilities ==
The WGS satellites will complement the DSCS III Service Life Enhancement Program (SLEP) and GBS payloads and will offset the eventual decline in DSCS III capability. WGS will offer 4.875 GHz of instantaneous switchable bandwidth, thus each WGS can supply more than 10 times the capacity of a DSCS III Service Life Enhancement Program (SLEP) satellite. Once the full constellation of six WGS satellites is operational, they will replace the DSCS system. WGS-1 with its 2.4 Gbit/s wideband capacity, provided greater capability and bandwidth than all the DSCS satellites combined.

== Segments ==
Operation and usage of the system is broken into 3 segments.

The end users of the communication services provided by the WGS are described by the DoD as the terminal segment. Users include the Australian Defence Force and U.S. Army ground mobile terminals, U.S. Navy ships and submarines, national command authorities for the nuclear forces, and various national security/allied national forces. Additionally, the Satellite Control Network will also use the WGS in a similar manner as the DSCS III constellation is used to route ATM packets through the Defense Information Systems Agency (DISA) "cloud" to establish command and control streams with various satellite constellations. One of the emerging applications is SATCOM-ON-The-Move which is now being extensively used on the military tactical vehicles for Blue Force Tracking and C3 missions.

The satellite operators in charge of commanding and monitoring the satellite's bus and payload systems as well as managing the network operating over the satellite are the control segment. Like the DSCS constellation that WGS will replace, spacecraft bus is commanded by the 4th Space Operations Squadron of Schriever Space Force Base, Colorado. Payload commanding and network control is handled by the Army 53rd Signal Battalion headquartered at nearby Peterson Space Force Base, Colorado with subordinate elements A Company at Fort Detrick, Maryland, B Company at Fort Meade, Maryland, C Company at Landstuhl, Germany, D Company at Wahiawa, Hawaii, and E Company at Fort Buckner, Okinawa, Japan.

The primary contractor for the satellites themselves is Boeing Satellite Development Center, which is building them around the Boeing 702HP satellite bus. Originally five satellites were planned. On 3 October 2007, Australia's Department of Defence announced that the country would fund a sixth satellite in the constellation. Once in their orbits at an altitude of 35,900 km (22,300 mi), each will weigh approximately 3,400 kg (7,500 lb). The program intends to use both the Delta IV and the Atlas V as launch vehicles. The Air Force Space Command estimates each satellite will cost approximately US$300 million.

The first three WGS satellites form Block I of the space segment. The next three, WGS satellites 4, 5, and 6, make up Block II. The next four, WGS-7, -8, -9, and -10, make up Block II Follow-On.

== Launches ==
=== Block I ===
The first launch of WGS-1 was conducted by United Launch Alliance (ULA) on 11 October 2007, at 00:22 UTC. The satellite was carried by an Atlas V 421 launch vehicle lifting off from SLC-41 at Cape Canaveral Air Force Station (CCAFS). After launch, the WGS-1 satellite was given the U.S. military designation USA-195. Its coverage area stretches from the West Coast of the United States to Southeast Asia.

The launch of the second satellite, WGS-2 (USA-204), was also conducted by ULA, on 4 April 2009 at 01:31:00 UTC, using an Atlas V 421 launch vehicle. The WGS-2 satellite was positioned over the equator around 60° East longitude (over the Indian Ocean) for use by United States Central Command in Afghanistan, Iraq and other parts of Southwest Asia. Originally, the second spacecraft was to fly on the Delta IV M+ (5,4), and the third on the Atlas V 421, but they were switched for an undisclosed reason.

WGS-3 (USA-211) was launched on 6 December 2009, at 01:47:00 UTC, covers the Atlantic Ocean. The satellite was launched by a Delta IV M+ (5,4) launch vehicle, originally an Atlas V 421 but replaced with WGS-2.

=== Block II ===
WGS-4 (USA-233), the first satellite of the Block II, was launched by United Launch Alliance (ULA) from SLC-37B at the Cape Canaveral Air Force Station (CCAFS) by a Delta IV M+ (5,4) on 20 January 2012, at 00:38:00 UTC.

WGS-5 (USA-243) was successfully launched by a Delta IV launch vehicle flying in the Medium+ (5,4) configuration, with lift-off taking place from SLC-37B in Florida on 25 May 2013, at 00:27 UTC.

WGS-6 (USA-244) was launched on a Delta IV launch vehicle on 8 August 2013, at 00:29 UTC from Cape Canaveral Air Force Station (CCAFS).

=== Block II Follow-On ===
On 23 August 2010, Boeing was awarded an Air Force contract worth US$182 million to begin work on the seventh WGS satellite. The new satellite was procured under the WGS Block II Follow-On contract which included options for production of up to six WGS satellites.

WGS-7 (USA-263) was successfully launched by a Delta IV Medium+ (5,4) launch vehicle, with lift-off taking place from Space Launch Complex 37B (SLC-37B) in Florida on 24 July 2015, at 00:57 UTC.

WGS-8 (USA-272) was successfully launched by a Delta IV Medium+ (5,4) launch vehicle on 7 December 2016 at 23:52 UTC from SLC-37B at Cape Canaveral Air Force Station in Florida. The Delta IV's Delta Cryogenic Second Stage deployed the satellite as planned on 8 December 2016, at 00:35 UTC.

WGS-9 (USA-275) was launched on 19 March 2017, at 00:18:00 UTC. It was launched on a Delta IV Medium+ (5,4) launch vehicle. The satellite was partially-funded by allied nations, including Canada, Denmark, the Netherlands, Luxembourg, New Zealand and the United States, for military access to the entire WGS constellation.

WGS-10 (USA-291) was launched atop a Delta IV Medium+ (5,4) launch vehicle from Cape Canaveral Air Force Station on 16 March 2019, at 02:26 UTC. WGS-10 is the latest part of a constellation of highly-capable communications satellites that serve the armed forces of the United States and its allies. It carries Ka-band and X-band transponders with 8.088 gigahertz of bandwidth.

WGS-11 In 2019, Boeing received a contract to build an 11th WGS satellite. WGS-11 is to be completed by Boeing by 2024 under a US$605 million contract.

WGS-12 In 2024, Boeing announced it had a $439.6 million contract to build an additional satellite, WGS-12; which will launch on a Falcon Heavy as USSF-206.

U.S. Space Force Wideband Global SATCOM launch patches
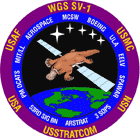

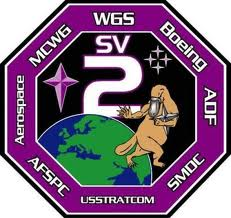

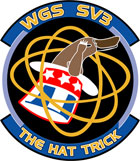

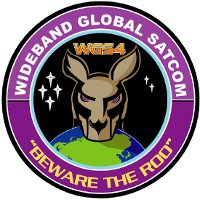

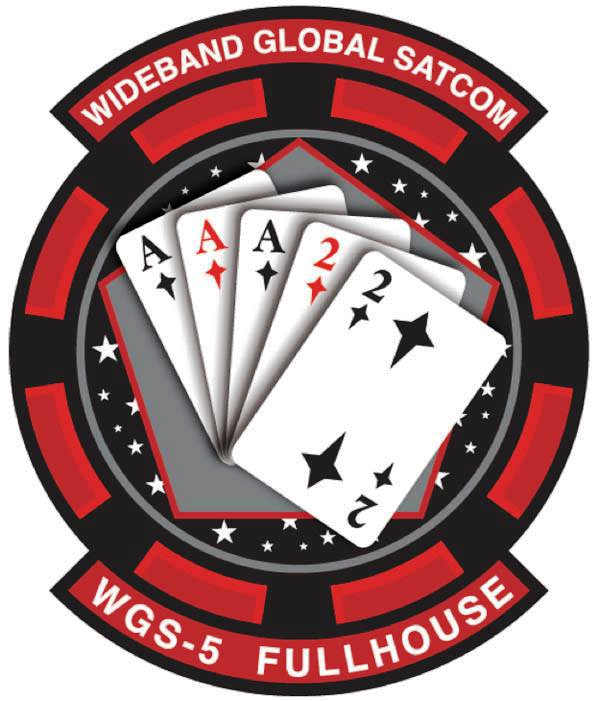

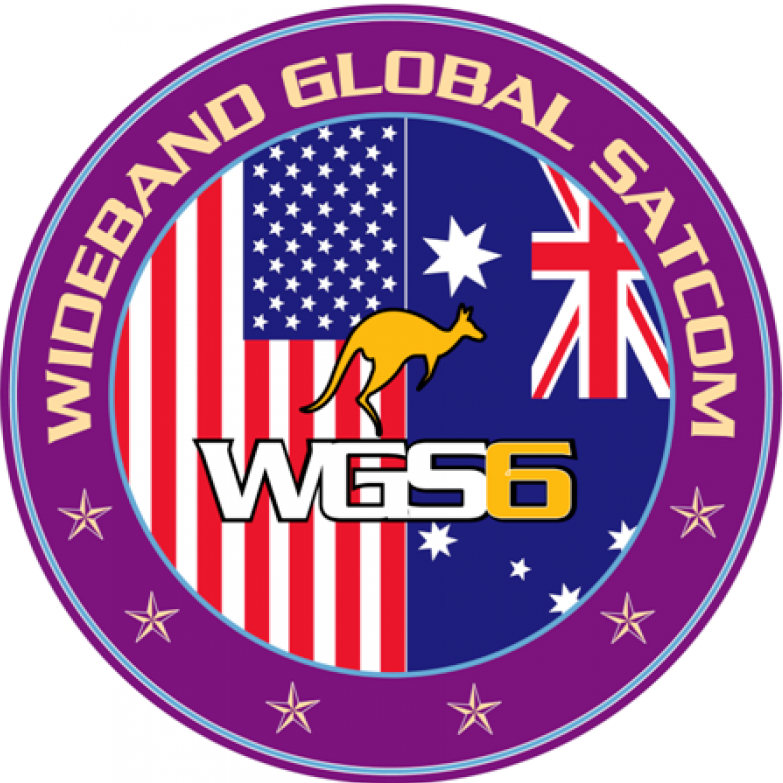

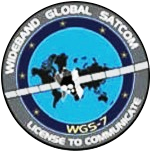

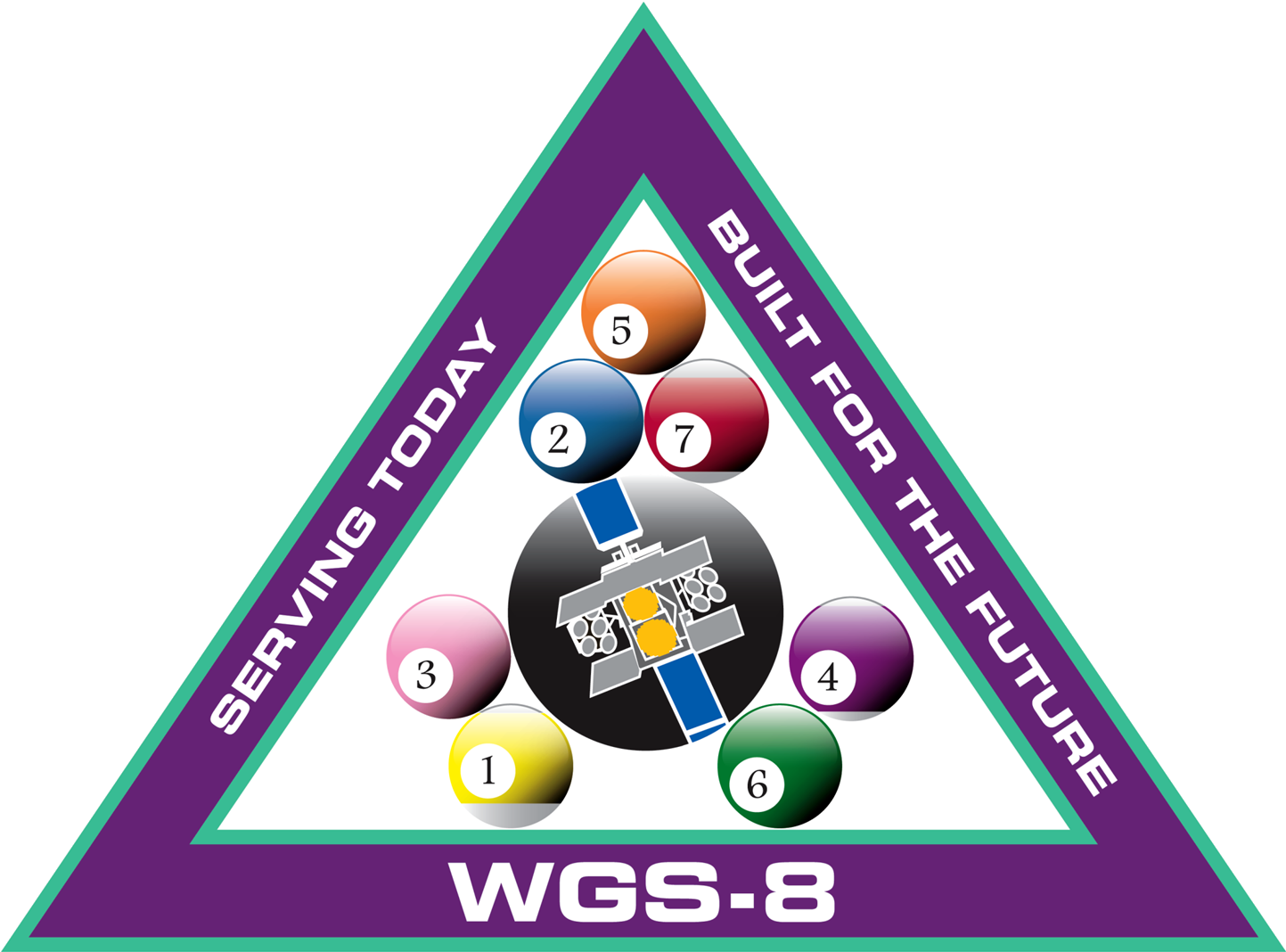

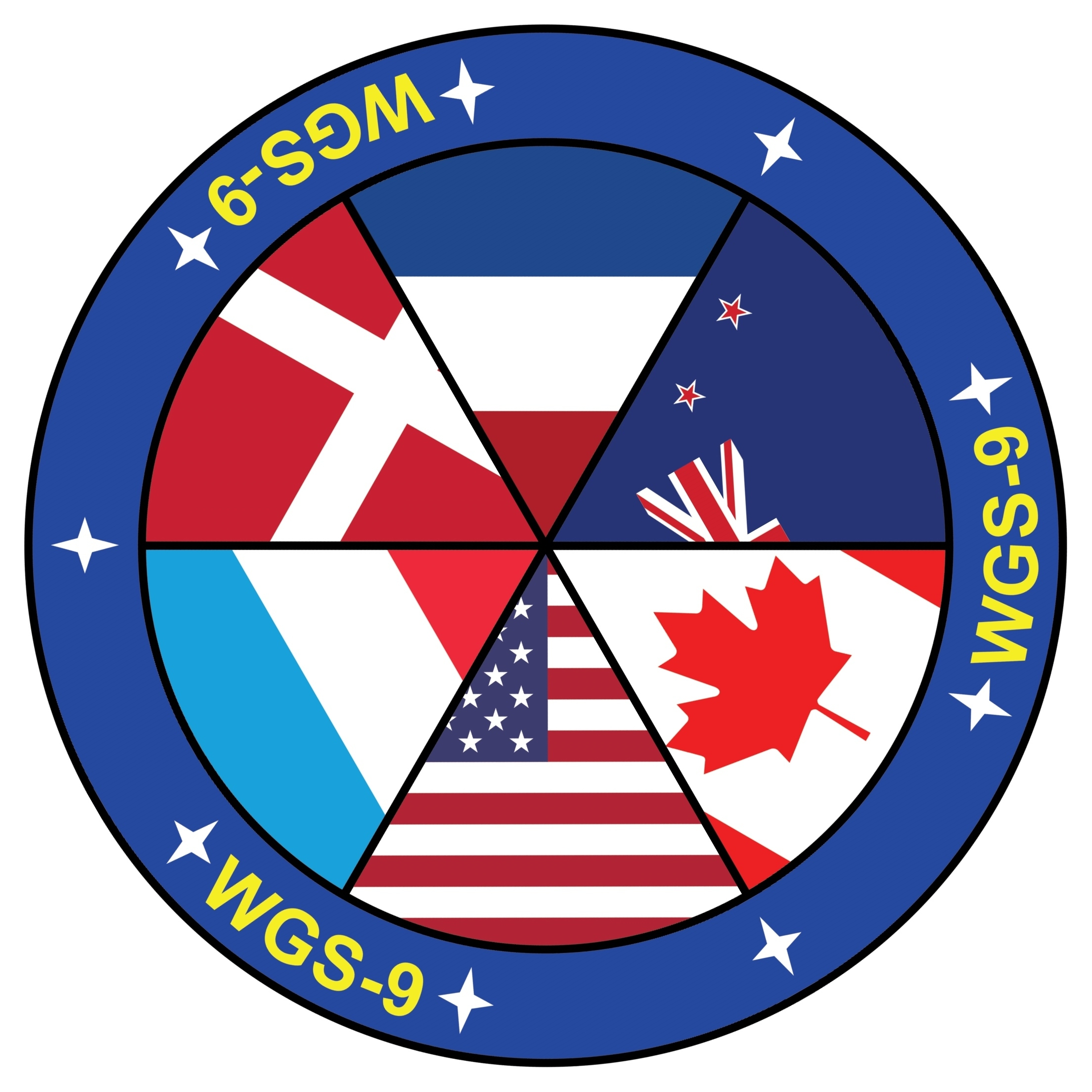

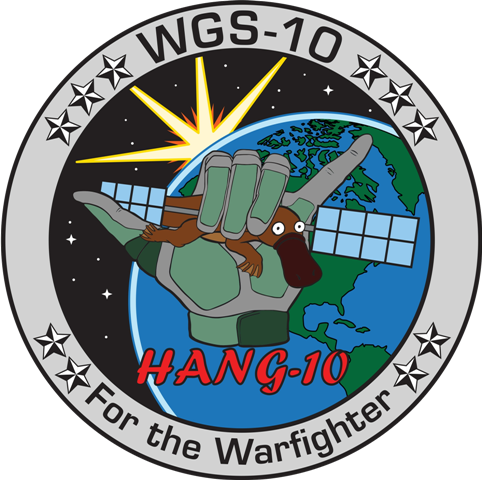

== See also ==
- Advanced Extremely High Frequency (AEHF)
- MILSTAR
- Defense Satellite Communications System (DSCS)
- Syracuse IV
