= Cape Canaveral Space Launch Complex 37 =

Space vehicle launch complex on Cape Canaveral Space Force Station, Florida

Space Launch Complex 37
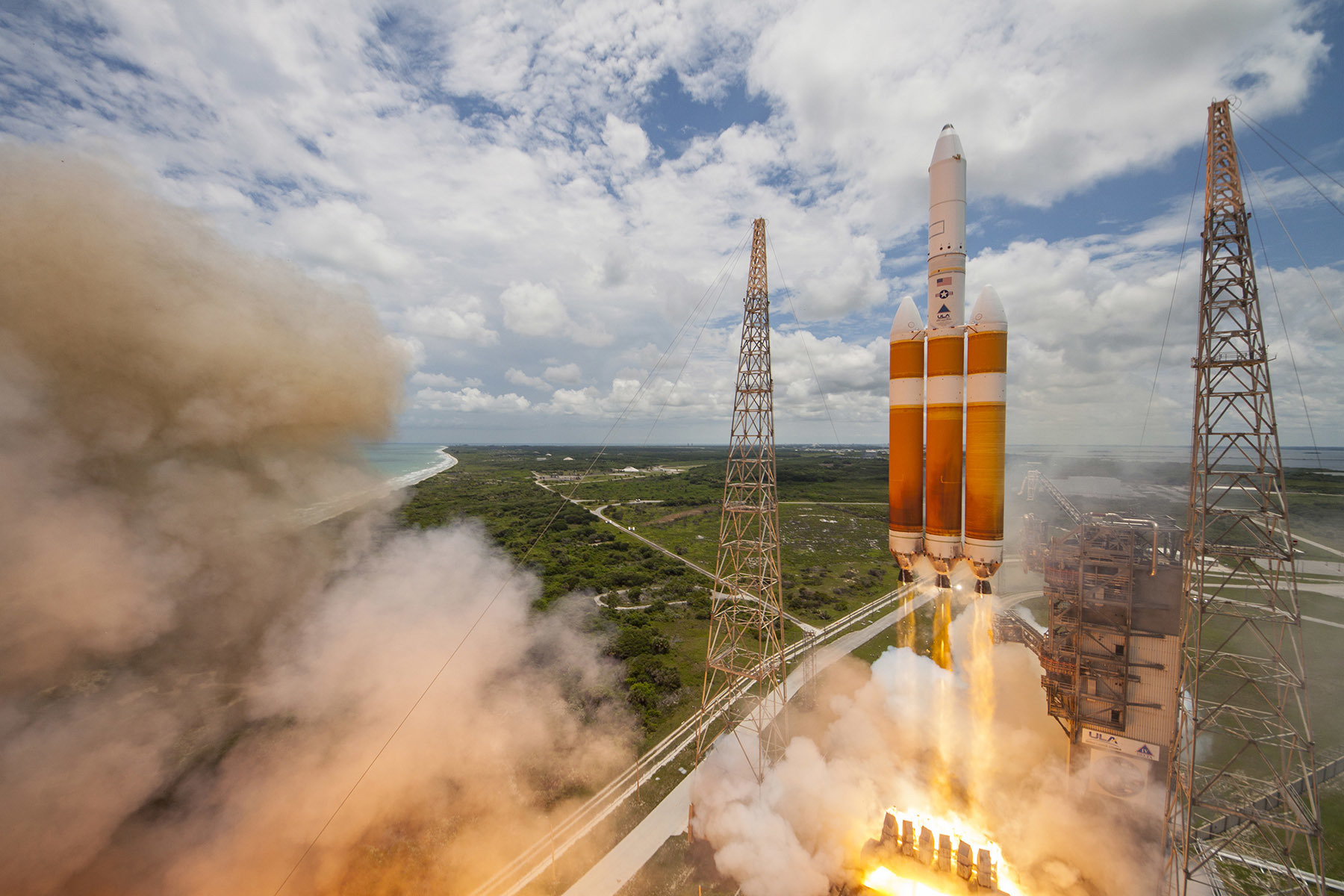
- Delta IV Heavy lifts off from SLC-37B in June 2016 carrying NROL-37
- Interactive map of Space Launch Complex 37
- Launch site: Cape Canaveral Space Force Station
- Location: 28°31′55″N 80°34′01″W
- Time zone: UTC−05:00 (EST)
  - Summer (DST): UTC−04:00 (EDT)
- Short name: SLC-37
- Operator: United States Space Force (owner); SpaceX (tenant)
- Total launches: 43
- Orbital inclination range: 28° - 57°
SLC-37A launch history
- Status: Under construction
- Launches: None
- First launch: Unused
- Associated rockets: Future: Starship; Plans cancelled: Saturn I, Saturn IB
SLC-37B launch history
- Status: Undergoing renovation
- Launches: 43
- First launch: 29 January 1964; Saturn I (SA-5)
- Last launch: 9 April 2024; Delta IV Heavy (NROL-70)
- Associated rockets: Future: Starship; Retired: Saturn I, Saturn IB, Delta IV, Delta IV Heavy

Space Launch Complex 37 (SLC-37), previously Launch Complex 37 (LC-37), is a launch complex on Cape Canaveral Space Force Station, Florida. Originally built to support the Apollo program, the complex consists of two launch pads: SLC-37A and SLC-37B. Pad 37A has never been used, while 37B hosted Saturn I and Saturn IB launches in the 1960s as well as Delta IV and Delta IV Heavy launches from 2002 to 2024.

As of January 2026, the pad is being overhauled by SpaceX for use as a launch site for Starship.

== History ==
=== Saturn I and IB (1964–1968) ===
Launch Complex 37 began construction in 1959, being envisioned to be a second site to launch the experimental heavy-lift Saturn rockets, joining Launch Complex 34 (LC-34) to the south. Originally, it was planned to be the launch site for an Earth orbit rendezvous (EOR) strategy to potentially be taken by the Apollo program, where a launch vehicle such as the Saturn C-3 would launch both the trans-lunar injection stage and the Lunar Excursion Module from the two pads, while the crew would lift off from LC-34 and intercept the two payloads in low Earth orbit. Despite NASA opting for a Lunar orbit rendezvous (LOR) approach and using the Saturn V from Launch Complex 39 to the north, they nonetheless accepted LC-37 to support the Saturn I program in 1963.

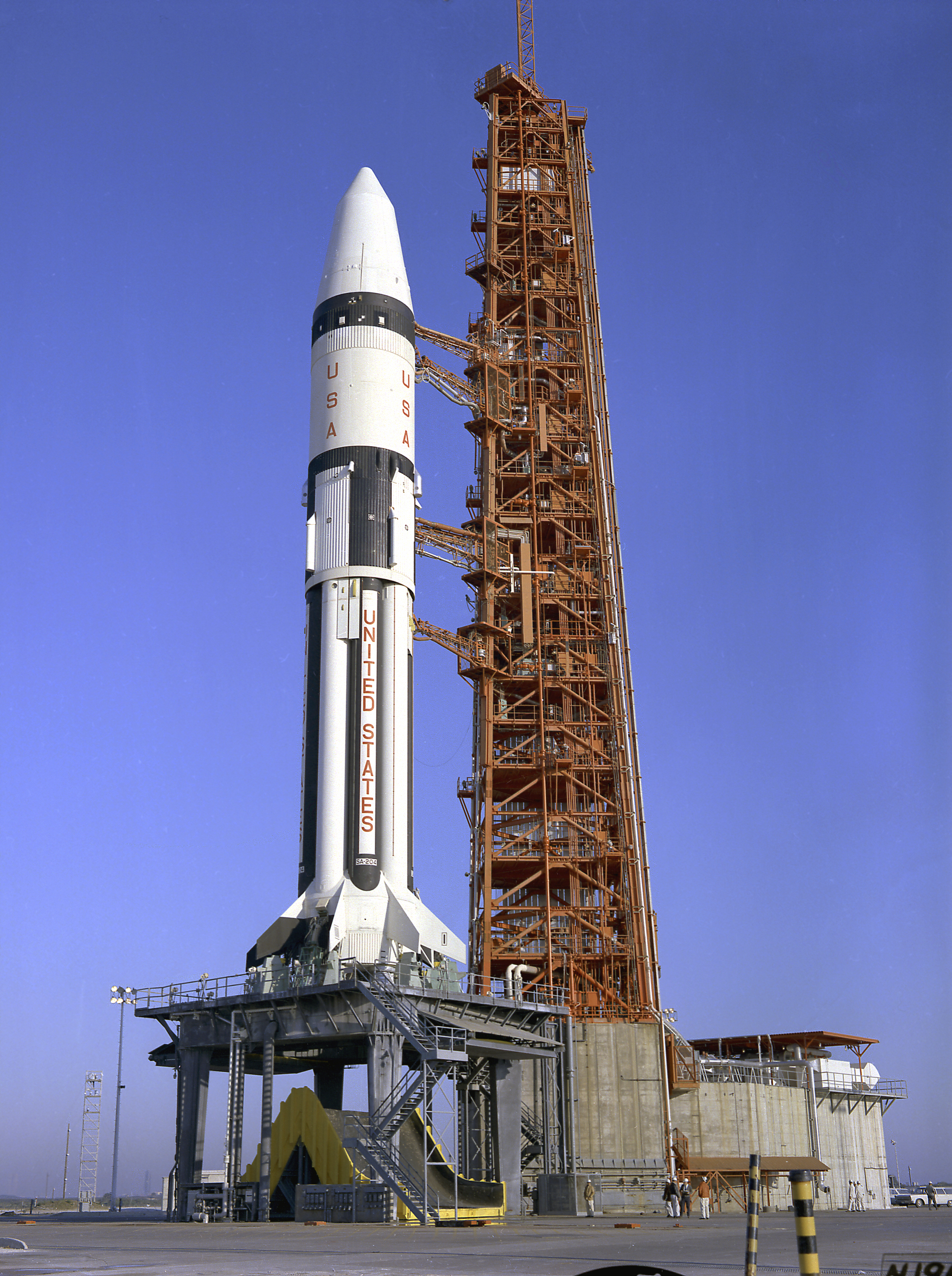
Apollo 5 at LC-37B in 1968

The original layout of the launch complex featured one Mobile Service Structure which could be used to service or mate a rocket on either LC-37A or 37B, but not on both simultaneously. The first launch from LC-37 came on January 29, 1964, launching Saturn I SA-5 as part of the rocketry development portion of the Apollo program. Over the next two years, a total of six uncrewed Saturn I flights were launched from the complex, mostly carrying boilerplate Apollo capsules alongside the three launches of the Pegasus project.

In late 1965, both LC-37 and LC-34 were modified to launch the Saturn I's successor, the Saturn IB. Similarly to its previous configuration, this was in support of Apollo development before the Saturn V's activation at Kennedy Space Center; however, the original purpose of EOR was also made ready as a backup in case complications render the Saturn V and LOR unfeasible. Only two Saturn IB launches were made from LC-37: the first one was AS-203 (or informally Apollo 3), which launched on July 5, 1966 and tested engine restart capabilities on the S-IVB upper stage. The second one was Apollo 5, lifting off on January 22, 1968 and carrying the first operational test of the Apollo Lunar Module in space. The facility was deactivated in 1972, following the conclusion of the Apollo program. Proposals were drawn of resuming Saturn IB launches from LC-37 and LC-34 as part of the Apollo Applications Program, but NASA instead opted to modify Launch Complex 39B for that role. LC-37 would sit dormant for the next 30 years.

=== Delta IV and Delta IV Heavy (2002–2024) ===
In 1998, the United States Air Force and Boeing came into an agreement to use LC-37 for launching the Delta IV as part of the Evolved Expendable Launch Vehicle program, getting rechristened as SLC-37 as a result of doing so. Having acquired the Delta family following their merger with McDonnell Douglas the previous year, Boeing aimed for the Delta IV to be a complement and not a replacement to the other active members of the time, the Delta II and Delta III. As such (and taking the difference in lift capabilities into account), a new launch site similar in size to SLC-37 was needed rather than continuing to use Space Launch Complex 17 (SLC-17). Facility modifications were made to SLC-37B in 2001, constructing a 330 ft (100 m) tall Mobile Service Tower fitted to service all planned Delta IV configurations. The complex was officially put into active service with the first launch of the Delta IV on November 20, 2002, carrying Eutelsat 70A to geostationary transfer orbit.

On December 21, 2004, SLC-37 supported the maiden flight of the Delta IV Heavy, which aimed at carrying a boilerplate and an assortment of small satellites into orbit. The next year, citing issues that sprang up with competition, Boeing announced that Delta operations at the pad and at SLC-17 would be combined with those of Atlas V at Space Launch Complex 41 (SLC-41) as part of a joint venture with Lockheed Martin. This handover would be made official with the establishment of United Launch Alliance (ULA) in December 2006, and SLC-37 supported its first launch under ULA with a Delta IV Heavy flight on November 11, 2007.

During the Delta IV era, SLC-37 underwent 35 launches of the family, consisting of 24 Medium launches and 11 Heavy launches. Almost all payloads launched were governmental in nature, with a majority of that subsection being military customers such as the Air Force, the United States Navy, and the National Reconnaissance Office. Some notable missions launched from the facility include GOES-N, GOES-O, and GOES-P for NOAA throughout the late 2000s, Exploration Flight Test-1 for NASA's Orion spacecraft in 2014, and the Parker Solar Probe in 2018.

Throughout the late 2010s and early 2020s, ULA began to wind down operations at the complex in preparation for the Delta IV's retirement. Their new launch vehicle to replace the Delta and Atlas families, Vulcan Centaur, was planning on having its launch site be at SLC-41 and as such ULA opted to let the SLC-37 lease expire. The final Delta IV Medium launch came on August 22, 2019 carrying a GPS satellite for the Air Force, while the last overall launch of the Delta family came with a Delta IV Heavy launch for the NRO on April 9, 2024.

=== Starship (from 2025) ===
During the lead up to the Delta IV's retirement, the United States Space Force (having taken over the Air Force's jurisdiction at Cape Canaveral) and SpaceX began evaluating SLC-37 as a potential launch site for Starship. This would complement SpaceX's existing operations at Starbase and its plans for Launch Complex 39A at Kennedy Space Center. As part of the process, the Federal Aviation Administration was tasked with preparing an environmental impact statement (EIS). The draft EIS, initially expected in December 2024, was released in June 2025. The final study's release was posted in November 2025, with a record of decision being formally issued by the Department of the Air Force on November 20.

SpaceX plans to construct two launch pads with integration towers on the eastern portion of SLC-37, designed to support a potential flight cadence of up to 76 launches per year. In March 2025, SpaceX announced it had received a limited right of entry for SLC-37, which it had used to begin demolition and site clearing. On June 12, the mobile service structure and lightning towers for the Delta IV pad were imploded in a controlled demolition.

The leasing provoked some criticism from residents of neighboring communities such as Titusville and Cape Canaveral, with worries being primarily aired about noise pollution stemming from the high launch cadence at SLC-37 and LC-39A.

== Launch statistics ==
Launch sites at Cape Canaveral Space Force Station and Kennedy Space Center
Active pads
Repurposed pads, not used for launches
Inactive leased pads
Inactive unleased pads
1 LC-39B
2 LC-39A
3 LC-48
4 SLC-41
5 SLC-40
6 LC-47
7 SLC-37
8 LC-34
9 SLC-20
10 LC-19
11 LC-16
12 LC-15
13 LC-14
14 LC-13 (LZ-2)
15 LC-12
16 LC-11
17 LC-36
18 LC-1, LC-2, LC-3, and LC-4
19 SLC-46
20 LC-21 and LC-22
21 LC-31 and LC-32
22 LC-18
23 SLC-17
24 LC-26
25 LC-5 and LC-6
26 LC-30
27 LC-25
28 LC-29

=== Rocket configuration ===
- Saturn I
- Saturn IB
- Delta IV
- Delta IV Heavy

=== List of launches ===
==== Saturn I and IB ====
All flights operated by NASA.

No.	Date	Time (UTC)	Vehicle	Serial number	Mission	Result	Remarks
1	29 January 1964	16:25	Saturn I	SA-5	SA-5	Success	First launch from LC-37 and first Block II Saturn I flight. First orbital Saturn launch and first with a live S-IV. Flight notable for being referred to by John F. Kennedy as the one that would place American lift capability ahead of the Soviets.
2	28 May 1964	17:07	Saturn I	SA-6	AS-101	Success	First Saturn I flight with a boilerplate version of the Apollo CSM. One H-1 engine failed during ascent, but mission performed nominally otherwise.
3	18 September 1964	16:22	Saturn I	SA-7	AS-102	Success	Boilerplate CSM flight.
4	16 February 1965	14:37	Saturn I	SA-8	AS-103	Success	Boilerplate CSM flight. Carried Pegasus 1 as a secondary payload attached to the S-IV, designed to study micrometeoroid impacts.
5	25 May 1965	07:35	Saturn I	SA-9	AS-104	Success	Boilerplate CSM flight. Carried Pegasus 2 as a secondary payload attached to the S-IV, designed to study micrometeoroid impacts.
6	30 July 1965	13:00	Saturn I	SA-10	AS-105	Success	Boilerplate CSM flight. Carried Pegasus 3 as a secondary payload attached to the S-IV, designed to study micrometeoroid impacts. Last flight of the Saturn I.
7	5 July 1966	14:53	Saturn IB	SA-203	AS-203	Success	Mission to test restart capabilities of the S-IVB to simulate trans-lunar injection. First Saturn IB launch from LC-37, and only Saturn IB launch without a payload. Also occasionally known as Apollo 3.
8	22 January 1968	22:48	Saturn IB	SA-204	Apollo 5	Success	Mission to test the lunar module in low Earth orbit. First Saturn IB flight following the Apollo 1 fire, and used Apollo 1's intended rocket for flight. Last unmanned Saturn IB launch, and last Saturn launch from LC-37.

==== Delta IV ====
All launches before 2006 operated by Boeing. All launches since 2007 operated by United Launch Alliance.

No.	Date	Time (UTC)	Vehicle	Configuration	Payload	Result	Remarks
9	20 November 2002	22:39	Delta IV	Medium+ (4,2)	Eutelsat W5	Success	Maiden flight of the Delta IV, and first commercial launch from SLC-37. First Delta flight not using Thor-based architecture.
10	11 March 2003	00:59	Delta IV	Medium	DSCS-3 A3	Success	First military launch from SLC-37.
11	29 August 2003	23:13	Delta IV	Medium	DSCS-3 B6	Success	
12	21 December 2004	21:50	Delta IV Heavy	Heavy	DemoSat	Partial failure	Contained two 3 Corner Satellites, nicknamed Sparkie and Ralphie, as secondary payloads. Maiden flight of the Delta IV Heavy. Common Booster Cores underperformed, placing primary satellite in incorrect orbit and failing to put secondary satellites into orbit.
13	24 May 2006	22:11	Delta IV	Medium+ (4,2)	GOES-13	Success	Launched as GOES-N. Part of the Geostationary Operational Environmental Satellites system of satellites. First GOES launch on a Delta rocket since GOES-7.
14	11 November 2007	01:50	Delta IV Heavy	Heavy	DSP-23	Success	First Delta IV launch following the creation of United Launch Alliance.
15	18 January 2009	02:47	Delta IV Heavy	Heavy	NROL-26	Success	NRO launch. Orion satellite, also known as USA-202. First National Reconnaissance Office launch from SLC-37, and first on a Delta IV Heavy.
16	27 June 2009	22:51	Delta IV	Medium+ (4,2)	GOES-14	Success	Launched as GOES-O. Part of the Geostationary Operational Environmental Satellites system of satellites.
17	6 December 2009	01:47	Delta IV	Medium+ (5,4)	WGS-3	Success	
18	4 March 2010	23:57	Delta IV	Medium+ (4,2)	GOES-15	Success	Launched as GOES-P. Part of the Geostationary Operational Environmental Satellites system of satellites.
19	28 May 2010	3:00	Delta IV	Medium+ (4,2)	GPS IIF SV-1	Success	Part of the Global Positioning System. First GPS launch on a Delta IV.
20	21 November 2010	22:58	Delta IV Heavy	Heavy	NROL-32	Success	NRO launch. Orion satellite, also known as USA-223.
21	11 March 2011	23:38	Delta IV	Medium+ (4,2)	NROL-27	Success	NRO launch. SDS satellite, also known as USA-227.
22	16 July 2011	06:41	Delta IV	Medium+ (4,2)	GPS IIF-2	Success	Part of the Global Positioning System.
23	20 January 2012	00:38	Delta IV	Medium+ (5,4)	WGS-4	Success	
24	29 June 2012	13:15	Delta IV Heavy	Heavy	NROL-15	Success	NRO launch. Orion satellite, also known as USA-237.
25	4 October 2012	12:10	Delta IV	Medium+ (4,2)	GPS IIF-3	Success	Part of the Global Positioning System.
26	25 May 2013	00:27	Delta IV	Medium+ (5,4)	WGS-5	Success	
27	8 August 2013	00:29	Delta IV	Medium+ (5,4)	WGS-6	Success	
28	21 February 2014	01:59	Delta IV	Medium+ (4,2)	GPS IIF-5	Success	Part of the Global Positioning System.
29	17 May 2014	00:03	Delta IV	Medium+ (4,2)	GPS IIF-6	Success	Part of the Global Positioning System.
30	28 July 2014	23:28	Delta IV	Medium+ (4,2)	USA 253 to USA-255 (AFSPC-4 (GSSAP #1/#2/ANGELS))	Success	
31	5 December 2014	12:05	Delta IV Heavy	Heavy	Exploration Flight Test-1	Success	Test flight of an Orion capsule, demonstrating flight operations in space and beyond low Earth orbit in anticipation for future operations with the Space Launch System. Maiden flight of an Orion capsule and what would eventually become the Artemis Program. Payload fairings replaced with capsule, launch escape system, and boilerplate European Service Module.
32	25 March 2015	18:36	Delta IV	Medium+ (4,2)	GPS IIF-9	Success	Part of the Global Positioning System.
33	24 July 2015	00:07	Delta IV	Medium+ (5,4)	WGS-7	Success	
34	11 June 2016	17:51	Delta IV Heavy	Heavy	NROL-37	Success	NRO launch. Orion satellite, also known as USA-268.
35	19 August 2016	04:52	Delta IV	Medium+ (4,2)	USA-270 and USA-271 (AFSPC-6 (GSSAP #3/#4))	Success	
36	7 December 2016	23:53	Delta IV	Medium+ (5,4)	WGS-8	Success	
37	19 March 2017	00:18	Delta IV	Medium+ (5,4)	WGS-9	Success	
38	12 August 2018	07:31	Delta IV Heavy	Heavy	Parker Solar Probe	Success	Part of the Large Strategic Science Missions and the Living With a Star program, aimed at studying the corona of the Sun. Only heliocentric launch of the Delta IV, last heliocentric launch of the Delta family, and first from SLC-37. Holds the current proximity record to the Sun at 9.8 solar radii (6.9 million km), and fastest traveling artificial object at 191 km/s (0.064c).
39	16 March 2019	00:26	Delta IV	Medium+ (5,4)	WGS-10	Success	
40	22 August 2019	13:06	Delta IV	Medium+ (4,2)	GPS III-2	Success	Part of the Global Positioning System. Last GPS launch on a Delta rocket, and last Delta IV Medium launch.
41	11 December 2020	01:09	Delta IV Heavy	Heavy	NROL-44	Success	NRO launch. Orion satellite, also known as USA-311.
42	22 June 2023	09:18	Delta IV Heavy	Heavy	NROL-68	Success	NRO launch. Orion satellite, also known as USA-345.
43	9 April 2024	16:53	Delta IV Heavy	Heavy	NROL-70	Success	NRO launch. Orion satellite, also known as USA-353. Last flight of the Delta IV, and last flight of the Delta family.

== Photos ==
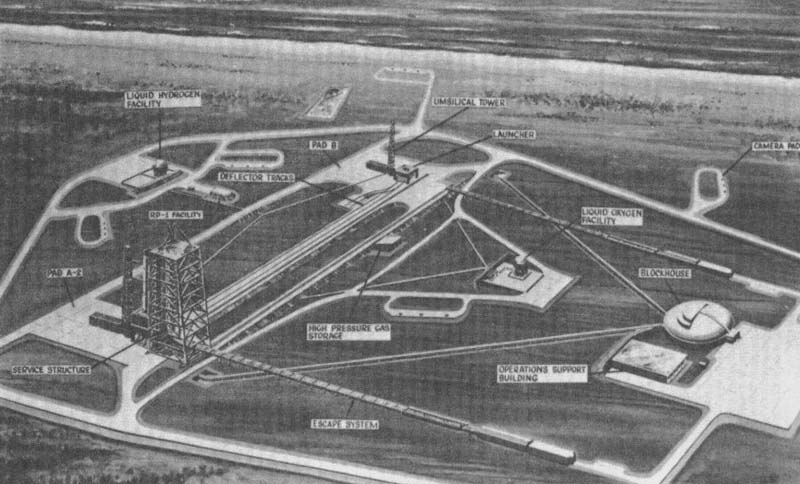
Map of Launch Complex 37 of the 1960s, with original Mobile Service Structure

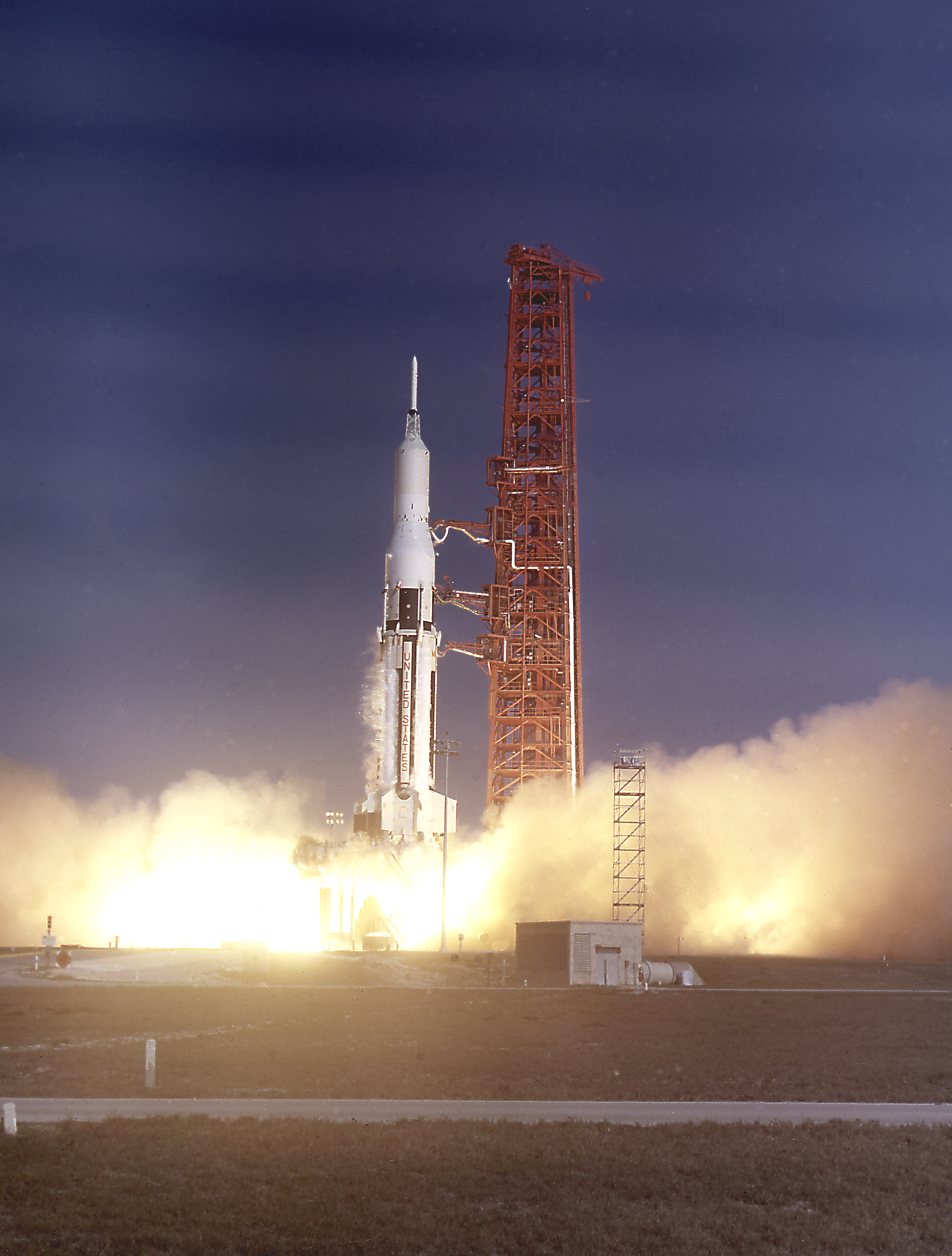
The launch of AS-103 with the Pegasus 1 satellite atop a Saturn I, from LC-37B in 1965

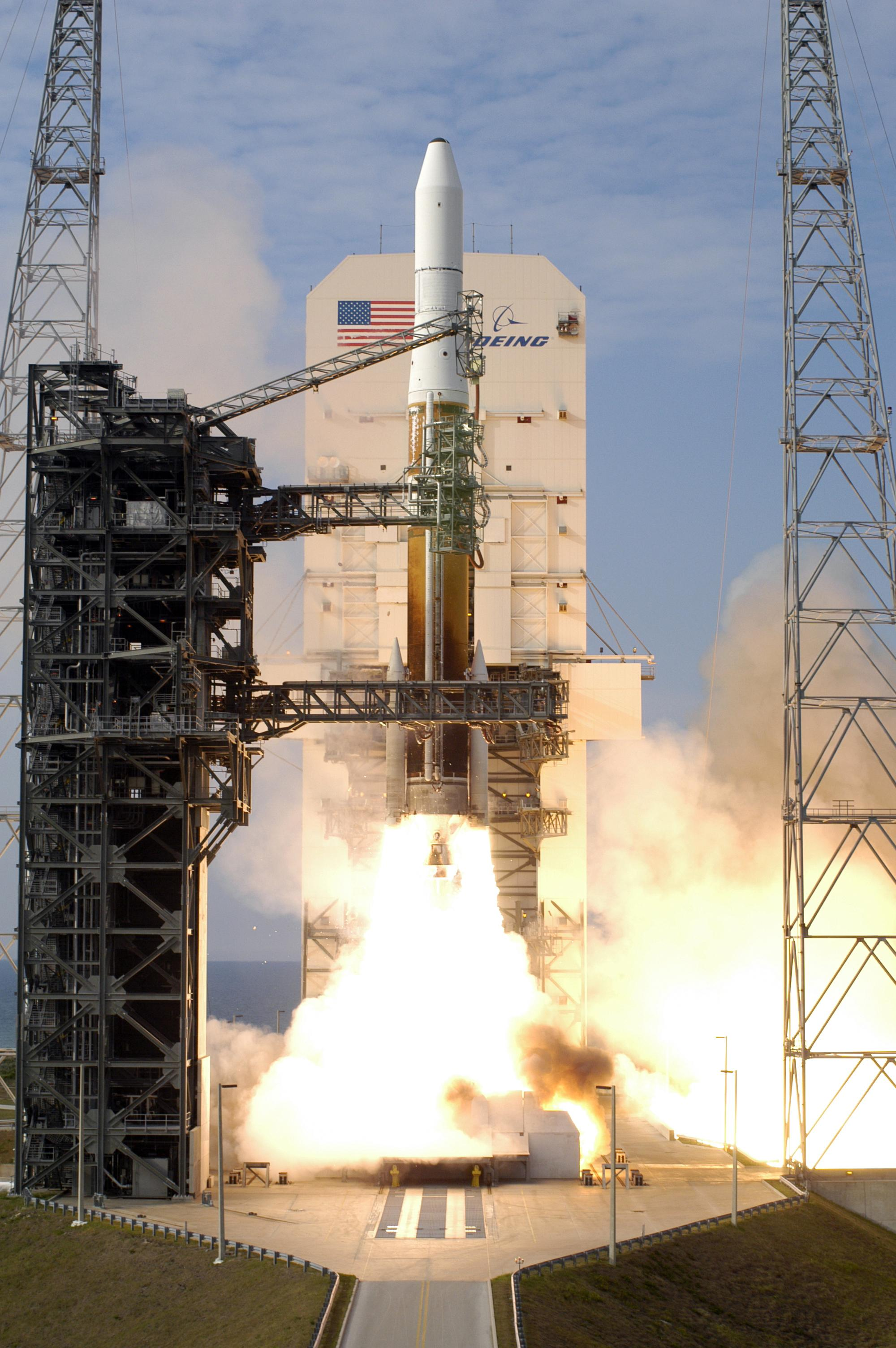
The launch of GOES-N atop a Delta IV, from SLC-37B in 2006

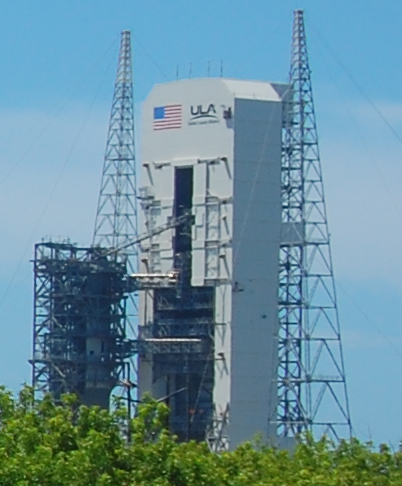
SLC-37B in 2010, with the Mobile Service Tower

== See also ==
- List of spaceflights by year
- List of Cape Canaveral and Merritt Island launch sites
- Project Apollo
- Cape Canaveral Launch Complex 34
