= Global Broadcast Service =

U.S. defense communications project

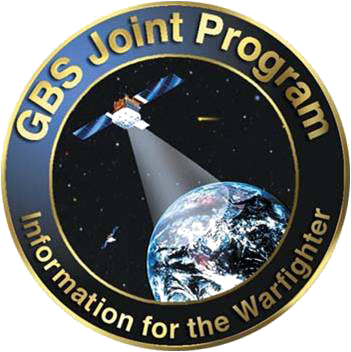

The Global Broadcast Service (GBS) is a broadcast service rapidly transferring information, which may be classified, for the U.S. Department of Defense (DoD) and its deployed and garrisoned units worldwide. Information may include video and digital data. GBS has become a critical piece of the DoD's intelligence, surveillance and reconnaissance architecture. An advancement in satellite communications, GBS fills two key military communications requirements:

- High data rates to many users at once
- High data rates to very small, low-cost user receive-only terminals

== History ==
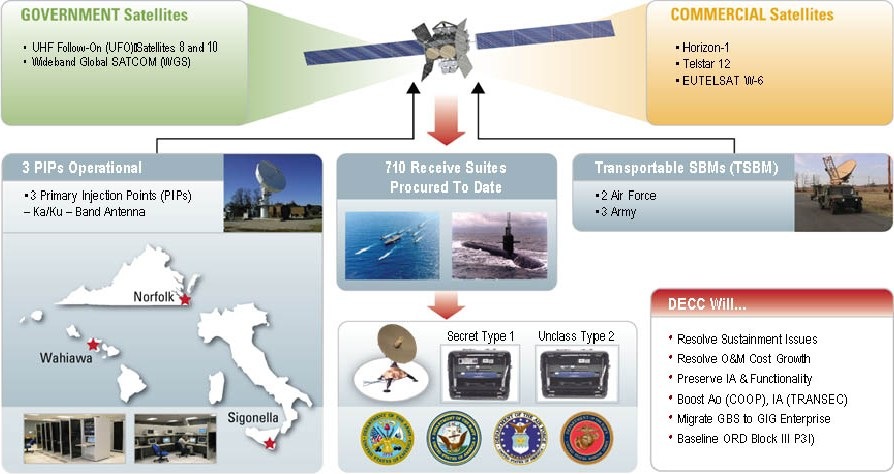
The United States Department of Defense's Global Broadcast Service general concept of operations, circa January 2010

Beginning in 1998, GBS began broadcasting via communication payloads on two Ultra High Frequency Follow-On (UFO) Ka-band augmented satellites and more recently all Wideband Global SATCOM (WGS) satellites (via Ka-band only). Initial Operational Capability (IOC) for GBS Phase II, Block II was declared in October 2008. In 2014, the GBS Satellite Broadcast Manager (SBM) architecture transitioned to the Defense Information Systems Agency's (DISA) Defense Enterprise Computing Center (DECC) via two sites, Oklahoma City, Oklahoma and Mechanicsburg, Pennsylvania and remain in operations there today.

At the onset of the GBS program, direct broadcast television was the dominant commercial model for the GBS architecture and the program followed that model using commercial Asynchronous Transfer Mode equipment with customized government application software. As commercial satellite Internet services moved to Internet Protocol (IP)-based equipment, GBS upgraded as well using the same commercially available equipment.

The GBS acquisition strategy was initially conceived as a three-phase program based on an evolutionary system design supported by commercially available technology. Technical problems with transmit suite software, transportable and fixed receive suite design, and subsequent program delays led to a Joint Requirements Oversight Council decision to defer a small subset of capabilities, field the system with non-deferred capabilities, and then incrementally field upgrades until all the operational requirement thresholds were met and IOC declared.

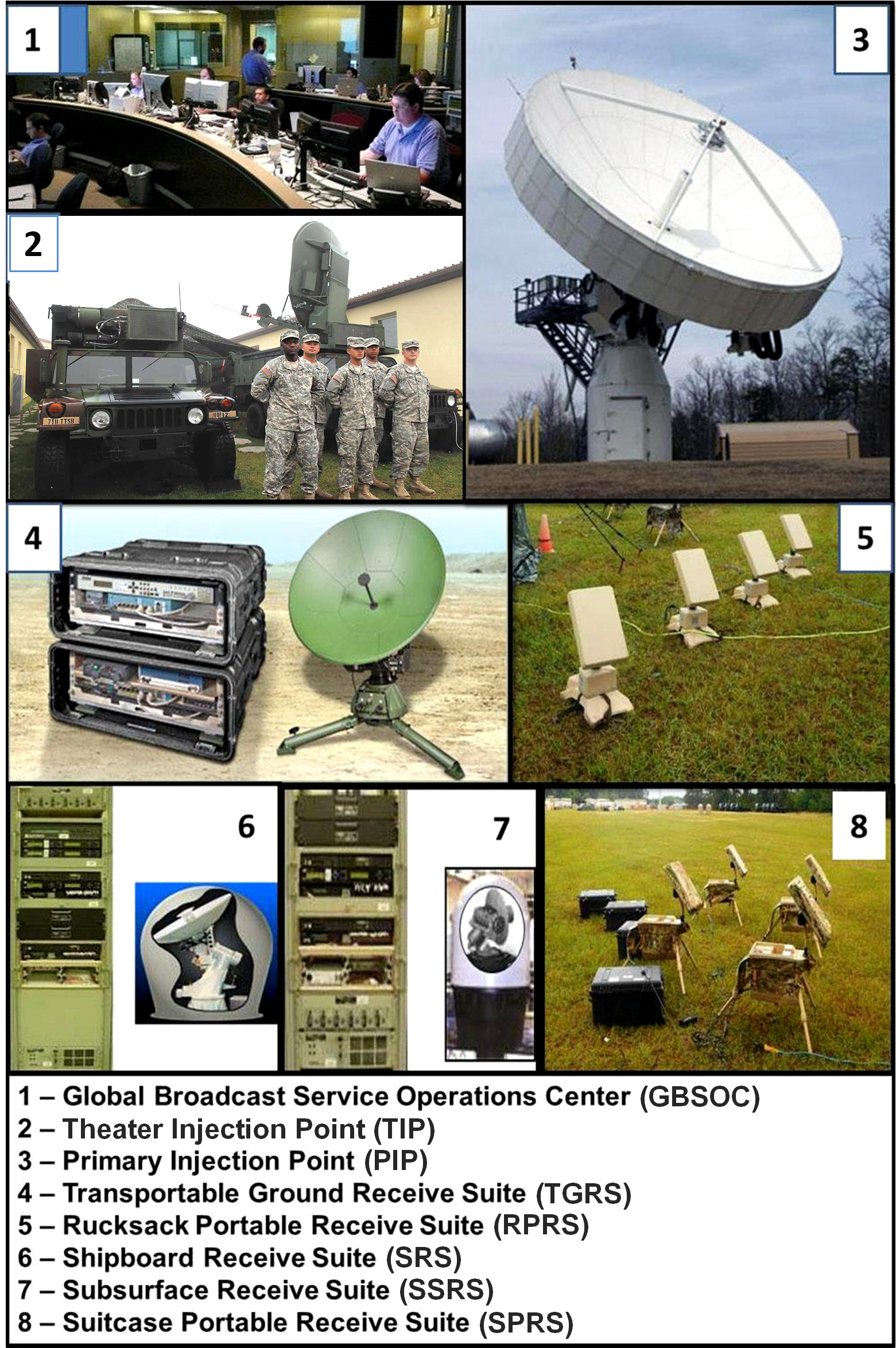
GBS's primary ground and sea components

In 2016, the GBS program manager developed the GBS Phase-IV capability that included an upgraded Transportable Ground Receive Suite (TGRS), development of Suitcase and Rucksack Portable Receive Suites (SPRS and RPRS), and integration of the new Digital Video Broadcasting – Satellite – Second Generation (DVB-S2) waveform that should provide more efficient use of available bandwidth.

== Operations ==
GBS consists of a SBM, co-located with DISA's DECC, and a variety of Receive Broadcast Managers (RBMs) owned and operated by the military services and other government agencies.

The DECC connects to a variety of national sources through the Defense Information System Network. The SBM, Primary and Theater Injection Points (PIP and TIP), and DoD Teleport Gateways will then generate IP-based broadcasts for transmission over UFO and WGS satellites to be received by units equipped with RBMs, with up to 45 Mbps, that is designed to provide users with a broad range of bandwidth-intensive products without loading traditional command and communication networks.

Deployed users can subscribe to large-volume national products --such as full motion video from unmanned aerial vehicles, digital maps, satellite imagery, and much more-- using net-centric prioritized delivery based on unit mission reception priority profiles. The SBM is the primary broadcast content site through which information and products are transmitted once to the satellite via PIPs and teleport gateways and received by multiple RBMs saving valuable bandwidth and time. Through use of the TIP, GBS is capable of injecting information directly from within a theater of operations under the theater commander's control.

According to the U.S. Air Force, "GBS provides service to 1000+ GBS receive suites deployed worldwide at U.S. Army, U.S. Marines, U.S. Navy, and U.S. Air Force ground sites, shipboard and subsurface platforms and at U.S. Northern Command-sponsored homeland defense organizations worldwide." The U.S. Army has stated that GBS "provides critical situational awareness, decreases decision times and increases combat agility."

== See also ==
- Telecommunications
- Communications protection
- Transformational Satellite Communications System
- Defense Satellite Communications System
- Advanced Extremely High Frequency
- Military Strategic and Tactical Relay
- NIPRNet
- SIPRNet
