= Crossband operation =

Method of radio communications operation

Crossband (cross-band, cross band) operation is a method of telecommunication in which a radio station receives signals on one frequency and simultaneously transmits on another for the purpose of full duplex communication or signal relay.

To avoid interference within the equipment at the station, the two frequencies used need to be separated, and ideally on different 'bands'. An unattended station working in this way is a radio repeater. It re-transmits the same information that it receives. This principle is used by telecommunications satellites and terrestrial mobile radio systems.

== Uses ==
Crossband operation is sometimes used by amateur radio operators. Rather than taking it in turns to transmit on the same frequency, both operators can transmit at the same time but on different bands, each one listening to the frequency that the other is using to transmit. A variation on this procedure includes establishing contact on one frequency and then changing to a pair of other frequencies to exchange messages.

Crossband operation is also used in communication between ships (inter-ship) with a HF installation. Frequencies that may be used can be found in the 'Manual for use by the Maritime Mobile and Maritime Mobile-Satellite Services'. Usually inter-ship communication is simplex only (VHF or MF), HF gives the possibility to work duplex but usually the transmitter and receiver are so close to each other that this may cause problems. The solution is to work on frequencies that are far apart e.g.: sending on 8 MHz and receiving on 12 MHz.

This mode is often used in amateur radio satellites, with uplink on the VHF band and downlink on UHF band such as IO-86, AO-91, SO-50 and ARISS. Some of the satellites such as PO-101 and AO-91 reversed that order with UHF band uplink and VHF band downlink. Such operation required a cross-band directional antenna that can transmit and receive on different antennas.

== See also ==
- See Radio frequency for more details about the radio spectrum.
