= Apogee kick motor =

Rocket motor used to circularise a satellite's orbit after launch

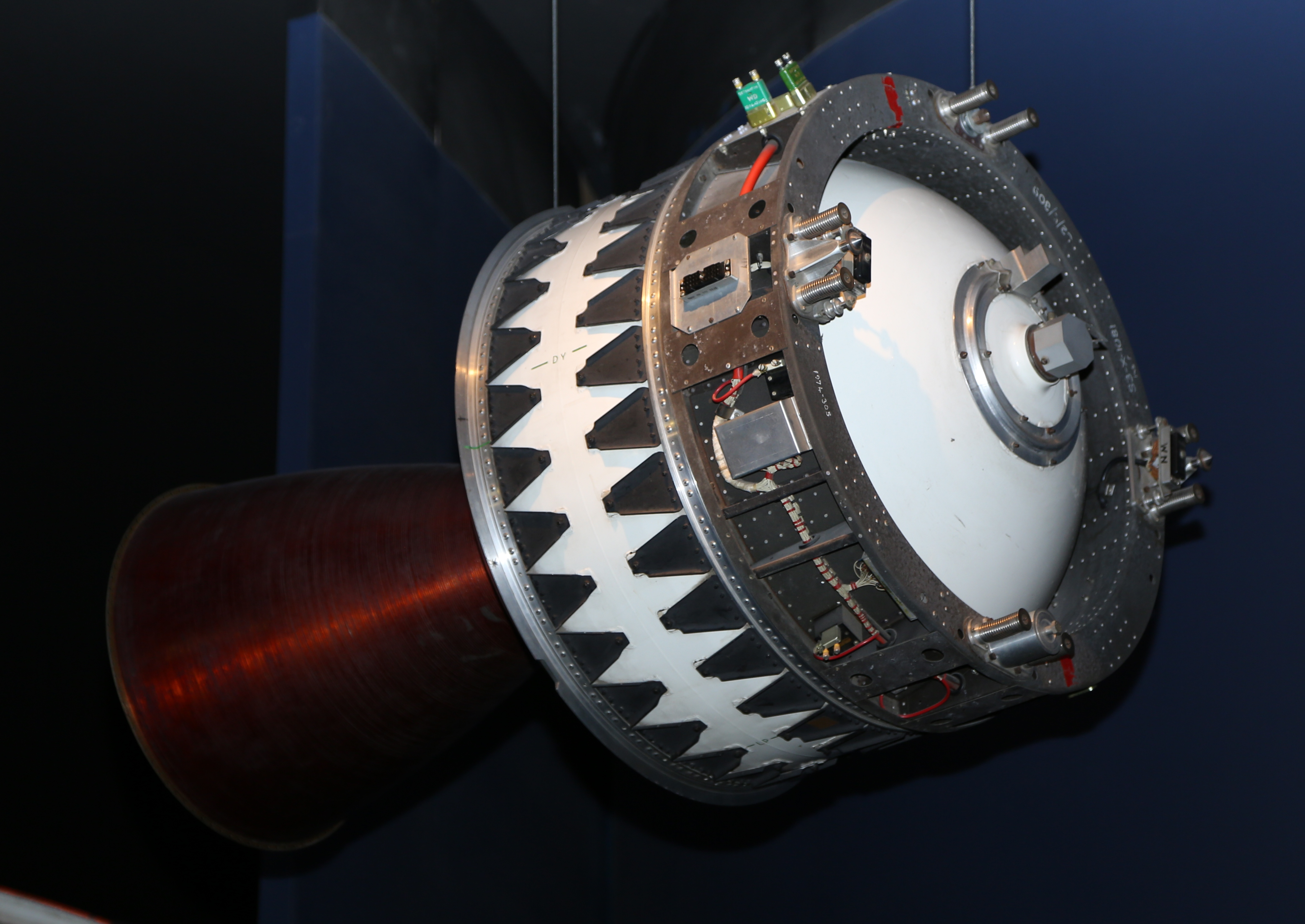
A Waxwing apogee kick motor.

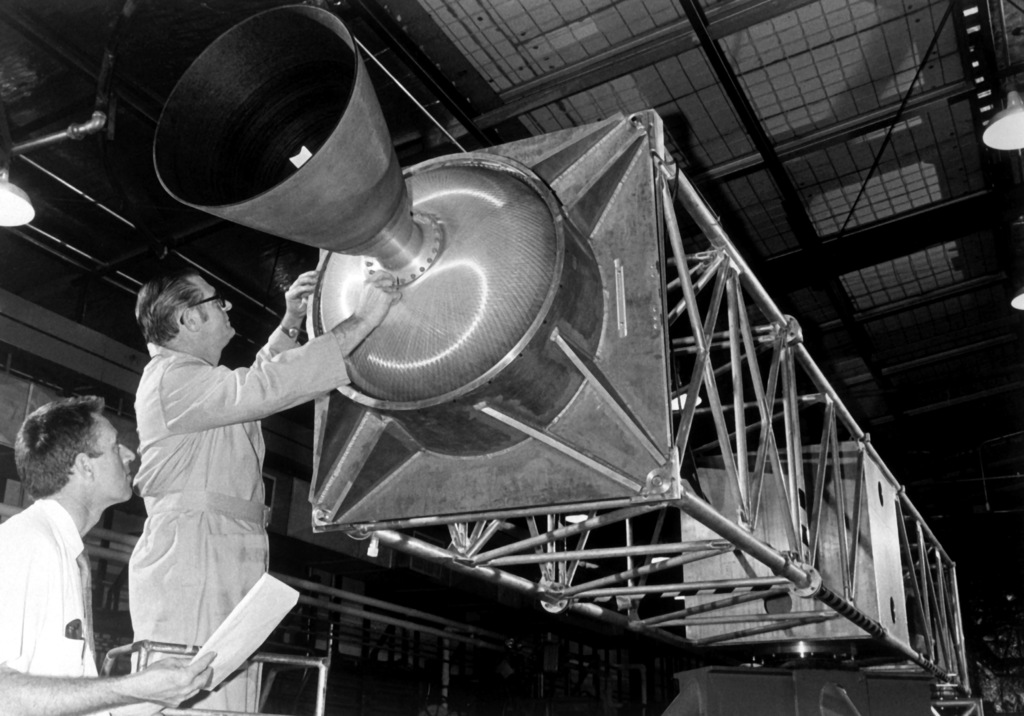
A solid-propellant apogee motor for the NATO III communications satellite (SATCOM) is being put into a 110,000-foot altitude test. The engine also underwent the impact, vibration and acceleration (IVA) test. Arnold Engineering Development Complex, Arnold Air Force Station. 1 April 1974.

An apogee kick motor (AKM) is a rocket motor that is regularly employed on artificial satellites to provide the final impulse to change the trajectory from the transfer orbit into its final orbit (most commonly circular). For a satellite launched from the Earth, the rocket firing is done at the highest point of the transfer orbit, known as the apogee.

An apogee kick motor is used, for example, for satellites launched into a geostationary orbit. As the vast majority of geostationary satellite launches are carried out from spaceports at a significant distance away from Earth's equator, the carrier rocket often only launches the satellite into an orbit with a non-zero inclination approximately equal to the latitude of the launch site. This orbit is commonly known as a "geostationary transfer orbit" or a "geosynchronous transfer orbit". The satellite must then provide thrust to bring forth the needed delta v to reach a geostationary orbit. This is typically done with a fixed onboard apogee kick motor. When the satellite reaches its orbit's apogee position, the AKM is ignited, transforming the elliptical orbit into a circular orbit, while at the same time bringing the inclination to around zero degrees, thereby accomplishing the insertion into a geostationary orbit. This process is called an "apogee kick".

More generally, firing a rocket engine to place a vehicle into the desired final orbit from a transfer orbit is labelled an "orbital insertion burn" or, if the desired orbit is circular, a circularization burn. For orbits around bodies other than Earth, it may be referred to as an apoapsis burn.

The amount of fuel carried on board a satellite directly affects its lifetime, therefore it is desirable to make the apogee kick maneuver as efficient as possible. The mass of most geostationary satellites at the beginning of their operational life in geostationary orbit is typically about half that when they separated from their vehicle in geostationary transfer orbit, with the other half having been fuel expended in the apogee kick maneuver.

== Use on interplanetary missions ==
A Star 48 kick motor was used to launch the New Horizons spacecraft towards Pluto.

== See also ==
- Hohmann transfer orbit
- Liquid apogee engine
- List of upper stages
  - Advanced Cryogenic Evolved Stage
  - Centaur
  - Yuanzheng – Chinese upper rocket stage
- Multistage rocket
- Space tug
