= XIPS-25 =

The XIPS-25, or 25-cm Xenon Ion Propulsion System, is a gridded ion thruster manufactured by L-3 Communications. XIPS-25 engine is used on Boeing 702 class satellites for station-keeping as well as orbit-raising.

== Specifications ==
Parameter	Low Power	High Power
Power Controller
Total Input Power (W)	2200	4500
Bus Input Voltage (V)	100	100
PPU efficiency (%)	92	94
Ion thruster
Total Input Power (W)	2067	4215
Thrust (mN)	79	165
Specific Impulse (s)	3400	3500
Electrical Efficiency (%)	87	87
Mass Utilization Efficiency (%)	82	84
Beam Voltage (V)	1215	1215
Beam Current (A)	1.43	3.01
