= Boeing Satellite Development Center =

Satellite manufacturing division of Boeing

Coordinates: 33.9296521°N 118.3917403°W

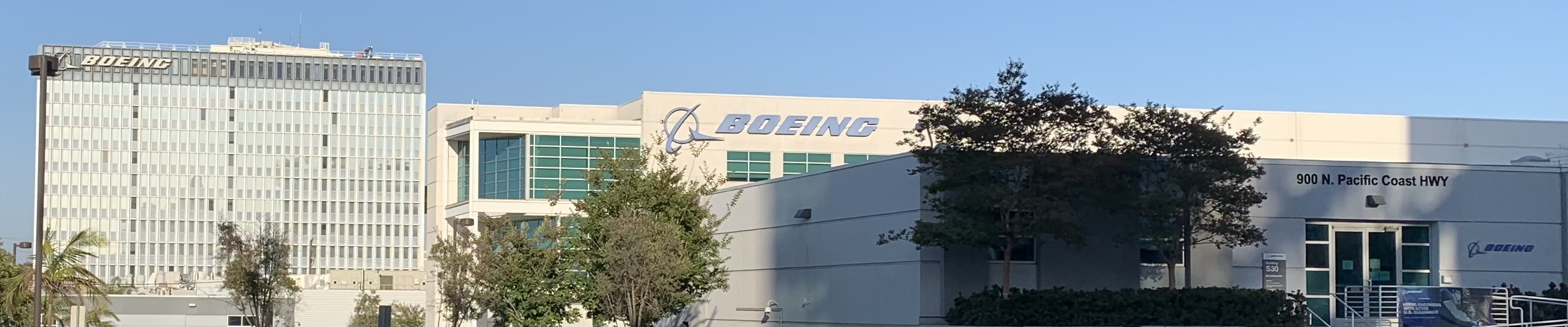
- Predecessor: Hughes Aircraft
- Founded: 1961
- Headquarters: El Segundo, California, U.S.
- Products: Satellites
- Parent: Boeing Defense, Space & Security, Boeing
- Website: www.boeing.com/space/boeing-satellite-family/

The Boeing Satellite Development Center is a major business unit of Boeing Defense, Space & Security. It brought together Boeing satellite operations with that of GM Hughes Electronics' Space and Communications division in El Segundo, California.

== History ==
The facility was originally built by Nash Motors in 1946 and begun production in 1948, building the Nash Rambler. Howard Hughes' Hughes Aircraft Company formed the Aerospace Group within the company when they bought the facility in 1955, when the Nash company became American Motors Corporation and divided the facility into:

- Hughes Space and Communications Group
- Hughes Space Systems Division

In 1953, the Howard Hughes Medical Institute (HHMI) was formed, and Hughes Aircraft reformed as a subsidiary of the foundation. The charity status of the foundation allowed Hughes Aircraft to avoid taxes on its huge income.

In 1961, the two Aerospace Group divisions were reformed as Hughes Space and Communications Company. Hughes Space and Communications Company launched the first geosynchronous communications satellite, Syncom, in 1963.

On 5 April 1976, Howard Hughes died at the age of 70, leaving no will. In 1984, the Delaware Court of Chancery appointed eight trustees of the Howard Hughes Medical Institute, who decided to sell Hughes Aircraft to General Motors for US$5.2 billion—this transaction was completed in 1985. GM merged Hughes Aircraft with its Delco Electronics unit to form Hughes Electronics. This group then consisted of:

- Delco Electronics Corporation
- Hughes Aircraft Company
- Hughes Space and Communications Company
- Hughes Network Systems
- DirecTV

In 1995, Hughes Space and Communications Company became the world's biggest supplier of commercial satellites. In 1997 GM transferred Delco Electronics from Hughes Electronics to its Delphi Automotive Systems and later in the year sold the aerospace and defense operations of Hughes Electronics (Hughes Aircraft) to Raytheon.

Hughes Space and Communications Company remained independent until 2000, when it was purchased by Boeing and became Boeing Satellite Development Center.

In 2005, Boeing Satellite Systems sold Boeing Electron Dynamic Devices to L3 communications. L3 merged its multiple Microwave tube companies L3 Electron Technologies (Torrance, CA), L3 Electron Devices (San Carlos, CA), California tube labs (Watsonville, CA) and L3 Electron Devices (Williamsport, PA) under one name, L3 Electron Devices. After merging with Harris Corp., multiple microwave tube companies survived as L3Harris Technologies, Electron Devices and eventually became Stellant Systems.

== Current operations ==
Hughes added the following to Boeing's portfolio:

- HS-376 – MEASAT, Marcopolo, and others
- HS-601 – ProtoStar II, and others
- HS-702, now the Boeing 702
- U.S. Navy UHF replacement – Military version of HS-601
- NASA Tracking and Data Relay Satellites (TDRS) – Communications with Space Shuttle and International Space Station (ISS)
- NASA Geostationary Operational Environmental Satellites (GOES)
- HSGEO Mobile – Based on the 702 bus, for Thuraya Satellite Communications, United Arab Emirates, and for SkyTerra

The purchase of Hughes Space and Communications Company in 2000 gave Boeing an impressive range of products for design, manufacture, launch and support of satellites. This was in addition to Boeing Integrated Defense Systems' other space assets, e.g. Delta launch vehicles, older-generation GPS satellites, and Rocketdyne and Rockwell's space operations (which include much of the hardware used in NASA's crewed space program, such as the Space Shuttle, International Space Station, rocket engines, etc.)

Currently projects at the Boeing Satellite Development Center (spacecraft being designed, built, tested, or prepared for launch) are satellites made for XM (satellite radio), DirecTV (satellite television), MSV (satellite mobile telephony), Spaceway (data networks), GPS (satellite navigation), and for the Wideband Global SATCOM system (military communications). Designs for ISAT (military orbital radar demonstrator), for additional GOES satellites (meteorology), and for other spacecraft, are currently being developed and proposed.

== Subsidiaries ==
- Spectrolab – American solar cell manufacturer
- Boeing Electron Dynamic Devices – Only US supplier of space qualified TWTs - sold to L3 communications in 2005 - Later became Stellant Systems.
- Millennium Space Systems

== See also ==
- List of satellites in geosynchronous orbit
