= Defense Satellite Communications System =

US defense satellite communications project

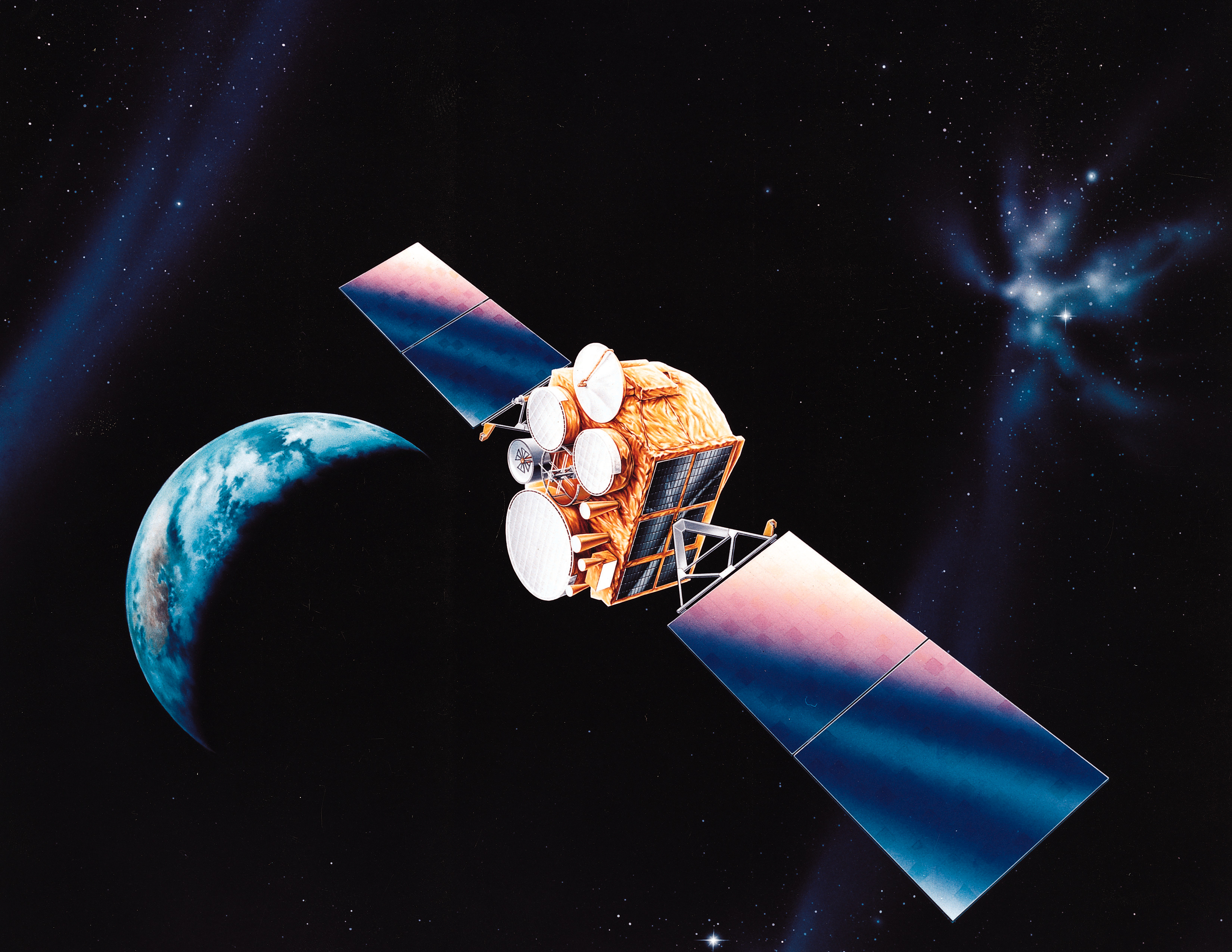
Illustration of the DSCS III satellite

The Defense Satellite Communications System (DSCS) is a United States Space Force satellite constellation that provides the United States with military communications to support globally distributed military users. Beginning in 2007, DSCS began being replaced by the Wideband Global SATCOM system. A total of 14 DSCS-III satellites were launched between the early 1980s and 2003. Two satellites were launched aboard the Space Shuttle Atlantis in 1985 during the STS-51-J flight. As of 14 September 2021, six DSCS-III satellites were still operational. DSCS operations are currently run by the 4th Space Operations Squadron out of Schriever Space Force Base.

== Background ==
DSCS went through three major phases — IDCSP (Interim Defense Communication Satellite Program), DSCS-II, and DSCS-III. Since the first launch, DSCS has been the "workhorse" of military satellite communications. All DSCS III satellites have exceeded their 10-year design life. The National Science Foundation use the DSCS satellites to provide additional bandwidth to Amundsen–Scott South Pole Station and McMurdo Station on Ross Island on the continent of Antarctica.

== IDCSP ==
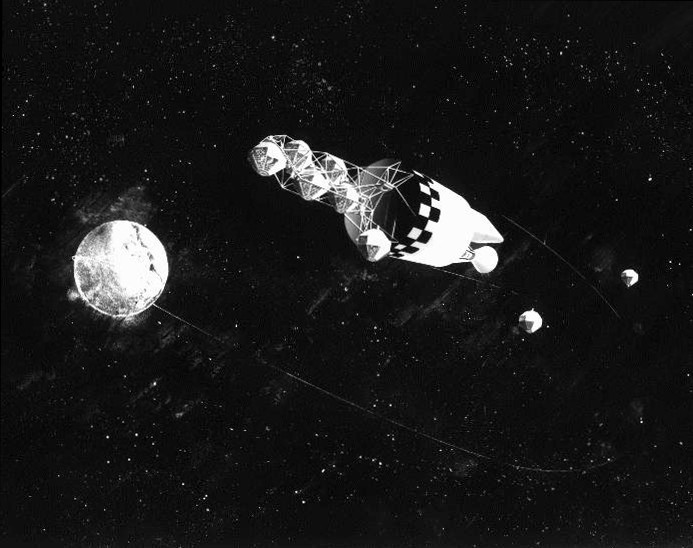
Artist's rendering of a Transtage deploying IDSCP satellites

In April 1960, the Advanced Research Projects Agency (ARPA) initiated the Advent program, aiming to deliver a military communication satellite. However, the design concept surpassed the technological capabilities of the time, leading to the cancellation of the program in May 1962. The Initial Defense Communications Satellite Program (IDCSP) was proposed as one of two recommended follow-up approaches to deliver a working satellite.

Philco (now Ford Aerospace) was contracted for the work. The IDCSP delivered a simple, spin-stabilized satellite placed into a sub-synchronous orbit that did not require station-keeping or active altitude control. The capacity was approximately 1 Mbit/s digital data.

The first launch, comprising 7 satellites, took place in June 1966. The system was declared operational with the 1968 launch and renamed to Initial Defense Satellite Communication System (IDSCS).

A total of 34 IDSCS satellites were built, with 8 lost in a launch failure in August 1966.

== DSCS II ==
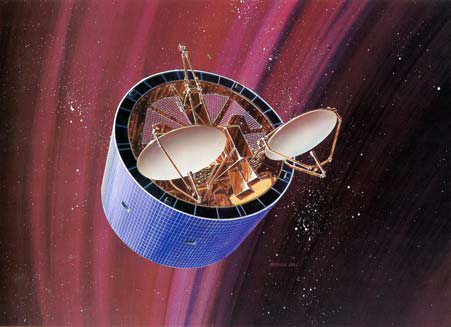
Illustration of a DSCS II satellite

Overview of DSCS II, circa 1977

DSCS II, developed under Program 777 provided secure voice and data transmission for the United States Armed Forces. The program was managed by the Defense Communications Agency (DCA), now the Defense Information Systems Agency.

The space vehicles were spin stabilized with a de-spun antenna platform. The body was mounted with solar cells, which produced 535 watts. Three NiCd batteries provided electrical power and it was supported by a hydrazine propulsion subsystem.

The communications payload included two 20-watt X band channels. The transponders were supported by steerable narrow beam antennas and drive mechanism for communications privacy.

The first DSCS II launch was in 1971.

== DSCS III ==
On 12 December 1975, research and development contracts were awarded to General Electric and Hughes Aircraft Company to begin DSCS III design studies, with the first Block 1 launch on 30 October 1982.

DSCS III satellites support globally distributed Department of Defense (DoD) and national security users. The final 4 of 14 satellites received Service Life Enhancement Program (SLEP) modifications. These changes provided substantial capacity improvements through higher power amplifiers, more sensitive receivers, and additional antenna connectivity options. The DSCS communications payload includes six independent Super High Frequency (SHF) transponder channels that cover a 500 MHz bandwidth. Three receive and five transmit antennas provide selectable options for Earth coverage, area coverage and/or spot beam coverage. A special purpose single-channel transponder is also on board.

=== DSCS III Spacecraft ===
Spacecraft Name	Other Designation	Launch date/time (UTC)	NSSDCA/COSPAR ID	Rocket	Status/Remarks
DSCS III-01	DSCS III-A1	1982-10-30, 04:05:00	1982-106B	Titan 34D	Decommissioned/Launched with DSCS II-16
USA-11	DSCS III-B4	1985-10-03, 15:15:30	1985-092B	Space Shuttle Atlantis	Decommissioned
USA-12	DSCS III-B5	1985-10-03, 15:15:30	1985-092C	Space Shuttle Atlantis	Decommissioned
USA-43	DSCS III-06 or DSCS III-A2	1989-09-04, 05:54:00	1989-069A	Titan 34D	Decommissioned
USA-44	DSCS III-07	1989-09-04, 05:54:00	1989-069B	Titan 34D	
USA-78	DSCS III-08	1992-02-10, 00:41:00	1992-006A	Atlas II	Decommissioned
USA-82	DSCS III-09	1992-07-02, 21:54:00	1992-037A	Atlas II	Decommissioned
USA-93	DSCS III-10	1993-07-19, 22:04:00	1993-046A	Atlas II	Decommissioned
USA-97	DSCS III-11	1993-11-28, 23:40:00	1993-074A	Atlas II	
USA-113	DSCS III-B7	1995-07-31, 23:30:00	1995-038A	Atlas IIA	Decommissioned on 9 December 2022.
USA-134	DSCS III-B13	1997-10-25, 00:46:00	1997-065A	Atlas IIA	Operational
USA-148	DSCS III-B11	2000-01-25, 01:03:00 UTC	2000-001A	Atlas IIA	Operational
USA-167	DSCS III-A3	2003-03-11, 00:59:00 UTC	2003-008A	Delta IV	Operational
USA-170	DSCS III-B6	2003-08-29, 23:13:00 UTC	2003-040A	Delta IV	Operational

== Image gallery ==
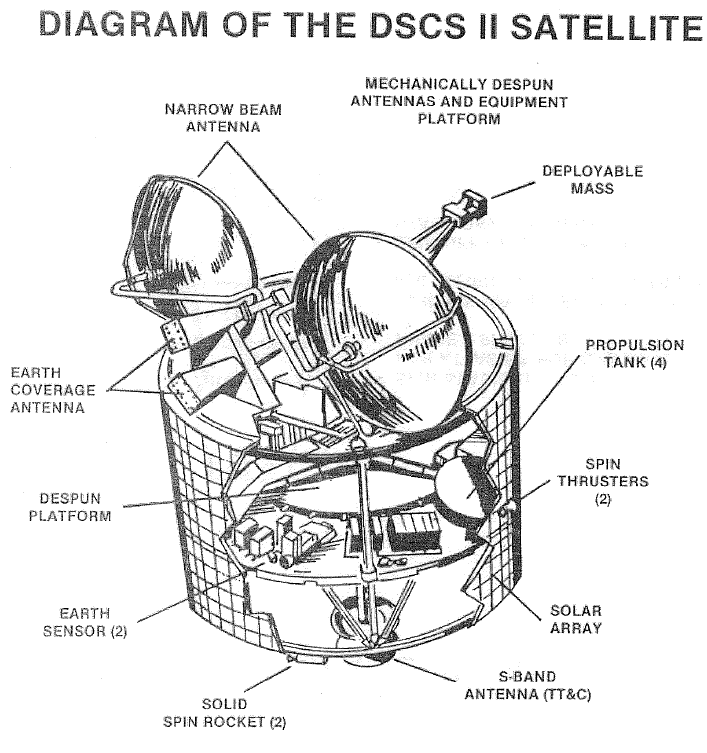
DSCS-2 diagram

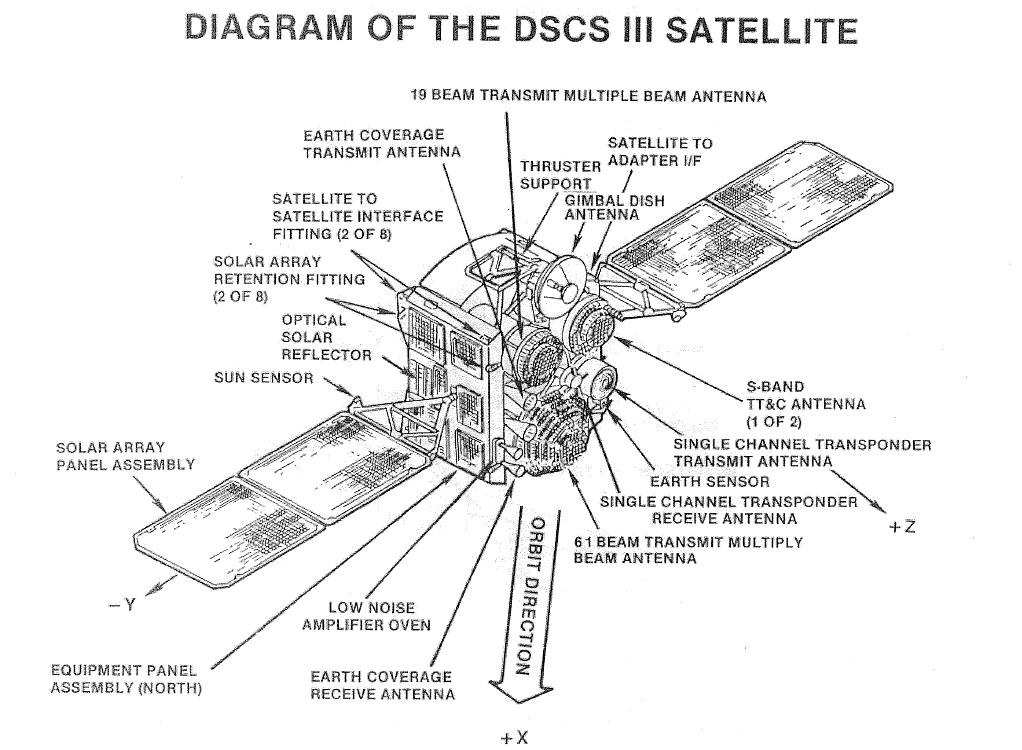
DSCS-3 diagram

== See also ==
- Milstar
- SpaceX Starshield
