= 天馬 =

Tenma Surname 天馬 (literally, heaven horse) may refer to:

- Tianma (disambiguation), Mandarin-language (ㄊㄧㄢ ㄇㄚˇ) and P.R.Chinese (天马) topics
- Chonma (disambiguation) (천마), North Korean topics
- Cheonma (disambiguation) (천마), South Korean topics
- Tenma (disambiguation) (てんま), Japanese topics

== See also ==
- The dictionary definition of 天 at Wiktionary
- The dictionary definition of 馬 at Wiktionary
- 天
- 馬
- Pegasus (disambiguation)
- Flying horses (disambiguation)
- Winged horse (disambiguation)
