= When Pigs Fly =

When Pigs Fly may refer to:

- When pigs fly, a figure of speech to express impossibility
- When Pigs Fly (Vollmer album), 1990
- When Pigs Fly: Songs You Never Thought You'd Hear (Cevin Soling album), a compilation album of covers by various artists, 2002
- When Pigs Fly (The Chicharones album), 2005
- When Pigs Fly (musical), a 1996 musical revue
- When Pigs Fly (film), a 1993 film directed by Sara Driver
- When Pigs Fly Incorporated, a television production company owned by Gary Glasberg

== See also ==
- Flying Pig Marathon
- Pigasus (disambiguation)
- Pigs Can Fly (disambiguation)
- Pigs Have Wings, a novel by P. G. Wodehouse
- Pigs Have Wings (film), a 1977 Italian film
