= List of restaurants in Estonia =

This is the list of restaurants located in Estonia. The list is incomplete.

Name	Location (city)	Active years	Further info	Image
Gunpowder Cellar of Tartu				
Kultus	Tallinn			
Restoran Moon				
Maiasmokk				
Meriton Grand Hotel Tallinn				
Olde Hansa				
Pegasus	Tallinn	1963–		
Sfäär				
Tallinn	Tallinn			
Café Tuljak	Tallinn			
Werner	Tallinn	1890s		
