= Pegasus (ship) =

Pegasus is the name of several ships and ship-types:

- PS Pegasus (1835), the name of a paddle steamer which sank in 1843
- HMS Pegasus, the name of nine Royal Navy ships
- USS Pegasus, the name of two United States Navy ships
  - Pegasus-class hydrofoil, a US Navy type of fast attack patrol boat
