= Cheonma =

Cheonma or Chonma may refer to:

- Cheonma, or Chonma (Korean: 천마; Hanja: 天馬; lit. 'Sky Horse'), a winged-horse, and traditional pattern of Korea

== Places ==
- Chonma County (천마군; 天摩郡), North Pyeongan, North Korea
  - Cheonma Reeducation Camp, a prison in North Korea
- Cheonmachong (천마총; 天馬塚), Gyeongju, South Korea
- Cheonmasan (천마산; 天摩山), Namyangju, Gyeonggi-do, South Korea
  - Cheonmasan station
- Mt. Chŏnma (Chonma-san), Kaesong, North Hwanghae Province, North Korea

== Military ==
- Chonma-ho (천마호; 天馬號), a North Korean main battle tank
- Cheonma (missile) (K-SAM Pegasus), a South Korean surface-to-air missile name for the Korean winged-horse cheonma (천마; 天馬)
- 7th Airborne Special Forces Brigade "Pegasus" (7공수특전여단 "천마"), South Korean Army; see List of paratrooper forces

== Other uses ==
- Cheonma (천마; lit. 'Heavenly Horse'), a short story by Kim Sa-ryang

== See also ==
- Tianma (天馬; Heavenly Horse)
