= Pegasus (disambiguation) =

Pegasus was a winged horse sired by Poseidon in Greek mythology.

Pegasus may also refer to:

== Arts and entertainment ==
=== Fictional entities ===
- Pegasus (Disney), characters in Disney's 1997 film Hercules
- Pegasus, a spacecraft in the movie The Mystery of the Third Planet
- Pegasus, a spacecraft in the TV series Space Odyssey
- Pegasus, an auto garage in the TV series Gekisou Sentai Carranger
- Pegasus Galaxy (Stargate), a location in the TV series Stargate Atlantis
- Pegasus Seiya, a Saint Seiya character
- Pegasus ponies, a subspecies of ponies in the My Little Pony franchise
- Maximillion Pegasus or Pegasus J. Crawford, a Yu-Gi-Oh! character

=== Film and television ===
- Pegasus (film), a 2019 Chinese comedy film
- "Pegasus" (Battlestar Galactica)
- "The Pegasus" (Star Trek: The Next Generation)
- Pegasus (TV series), a BBC serial about Robert Fulton
- PEGASYS-TV, a television station

=== Music ===
- "Pegasus" (instrumental), by The Allman Brothers Band
- Pegasus (Trippie Redd album), 2020
- Pegasus, a 2005 album by The Phoenix Foundation
- Pegasus Records, an offshoot of the UK 1970s B&C Records label
- Pegasus Award, an award in filk music

=== Publications ===
- Pegasus (game magazine), published beginning in 1981 by Judges Guild
- Pegasus (novel), 2010, by Robin McKinley
- Pegasus (series), 2011 novel series by Kate O'Hearn
- Pegasus (University of Central Florida magazine)

=== Other uses in arts and entertainment ===
- Pégases, or Pegasus Awards, an annual awards show honoring video games in France
- Pegasus (Efteling), a roller coaster in the Netherlands
- Pegasus (Mt. Olympus Water and Theme Park), a roller coaster in Wisconsin Dells, Wisconsin
- Pegasus (Pilz), a 1863 pair of bronze sculptures by Vincent Pilz
- PHM Pegasus, a 1986 ship simulation game

== Astronomy ==
- Pegasus (constellation), in the northern sky
- Pegasus (Chinese astronomy), symbolized as the Black Tortoise of the North
- Pegasus Dwarf Irregular Galaxy or Peg DIG, a member of the Local Group of galaxies
- Pegasus Dwarf Spheroidal Galaxy or Pegasus II, a satellite of the Andromeda Galaxy

== Military operations ==
- Operation Pegasus, a World War II operation
- Capture of the Caen canal and Orne river bridges, a World War II operation involving the Pegasus Bridge in Normandy
  - Pegasus Bridge, in Normandy, France, site of the 1944 operation
- Operation Pegasus (1968), a Vietnam War operation

== Organizations ==
=== Businesses ===
- Pegasus Airlines, a Turkish airline
- Pegasus Networks, a former Australian Internet service provider, founded in 1989
- Pegasus Records, an offshoot of the UK 1970s B&C Records label
- Air Pegasus, an Indian regional airline, 2015–2016
- Pegasus Universal Aerospace, a South African aerospace startup
- Pegasus (restaurant), in Tallinn, Estonia
- Pegasus Spiele, a German board game publisher

=== Other organizations ===
- Partnership of a European Group of Aeronautics and Space Universities, a network of aeronautical universities in Europe
- PEGASYS-TV, a public-access television station
- HMH-463 or Pegasus, a U.S. Marine helicopter squadron

== People ==
- Pegasus (artist) (Chris Turner, born 1988)
- Plotius Pegasus, ancient Roman jurist of the Proculeian school who practiced law in the 1st century CE
- Chris Benoit (1967–2007), Canadian professional wrestler known as the Wild Pegasus

== Sports ==
- Pegasus Athletic F.C., a 1971–1972 English football club
- Pegasus A.F.C., a 1948–1963 English amateur football club, based in Oxford
- Hereford Pegasus F.C., a football club based in Hereford, England
- Pegasus Cup, a rowing prize in the May Bumps, England
- Pegasus Stakes, an American horse race
- Hong Kong Pegasus FC, a Hong Kong football club

== Technology ==
=== Computing ===
- Pegasus (console), a video game system
- Pegasus (spyware), multi-platform spyware created by the NSO Group based in Israel
- Pegasus (workflow management), an open-source workflow management system
- PEGASUS, an encryption algorithm
- Ferranti Pegasus, a British computer developed in the 1950s
- Pegasus Mail, an email client
- Windows CE, an operating-system developed under the code name "Pegasus"
- Open Pegasus, a Web-Based Enterprise Management (WBEM) implementation

=== Vehicles and engines ===
==== Aircraft ====
- Aero Adventure Pegasus, a civil utility aircraft
- Boeing KC-46 Pegasus, U.S. Air Force refueling tanker
- HAI Pegasus, an unmanned aerial vehicle
- Howland H-3 Pegasus, ultralight aircraft
- Northrop Grumman X-47A Pegasus, a demonstration Unmanned Combat Aerial Vehicle
- Powrachute Pegasus, an American powered parachute design
- Pegasus VBJ, a VTOL business jet concept

==== Engines ====
- Bristol Pegasus, a radial aircraft engine
- Rolls-Royce Pegasus, a turbofan aircraft engine, originally manufactured by Bristol

==== Rockets and spacecraft ====
- Northrop Grumman Pegasus (Pegasus I), an air-launched rocket developed by Orbital Sciences Corporation
- Pegasus (satellite), three American satellites launched in 1965

==== Watercraft ====
- HMS Pegasus, the name of several British Royal Navy ships
- USS Pegasus, the name of two ships of the US Navy
- Pegasus-class hydrofoil, a series of U.S. Navy patrol boats
- PS Pegasus (1835), the name of a paddle steamer which sank in 1843

==== Other vehicles ====
- Pegasus (hovercraft), a vehicle made for educational purposes
- Pegasus Automobile, a Lotus Seven replica
- Great Wall Pegasus, a full-size SUV

=== Other technology ===
- SLWH Pegasus, a piece of artillery

== Other uses ==
- Pegasus (fish), a genus of fish known as seamoths
- Pegasus (mascot), of the University of Central Florida
- Pegasus (train), an international overnight express train service between Switzerland and the Netherlands
- Pegasus (typeface), released in 1937 by Berthold Wolpe
- Pegasus Bridge, in Normandy, France
- Pegasus crossing, a type of street crossing
- Pegasus Field, an airstrip in Antarctica

== See also ==
- Flying horses (disambiguation)
- Pegasus II (disambiguation)
- Pegasus Bay, New Zealand
- Pegasus Toroidal Experiment, a plasma physics experiment
- Peginterferon alfa-2a, an antiviral drug, sold under the name Pegasys
- Pegasus, New Zealand, a town
- Pigasus (disambiguation)
- Winged horse (disambiguation)
