= Pegasys =

Pegasys may refer to:

- A brand name of the medication peginterferon alfa-2a
- Pegasys, Inc., a Japanese software company that develops the TMPGEnc family of video encoding/editing programs
- Pegasus (disambiguation)
