= Pegasus II =

Pegasus II or Pegasus 2 may refer to:

- Pegasus 2, an American satellite launched in 1965
- Pegasus 2 (film), a 2024 Chinese film directed by Han Han
- Pegasus II (rocket), an air-launched rocket developed by Orbital Sciences Corporation
- The Pegasus Dwarf Spheroidal Galaxy, also designated Pegasus II

== See also ==
- Pegasus (disambiguation)
