= Tianma chafang =

Tianma Chafang may refer to:

- Tianma Tea House, a former tea house in Taipei, Taiwan, where a civilian's killing in 1947 led to the February 28 Incident
- March of Happiness, a 1999 Taiwanese film based on that incident
