= AS-105 =

Fifth and final orbital flight of a boilerplate Apollo spacecraft, July 30, 1965

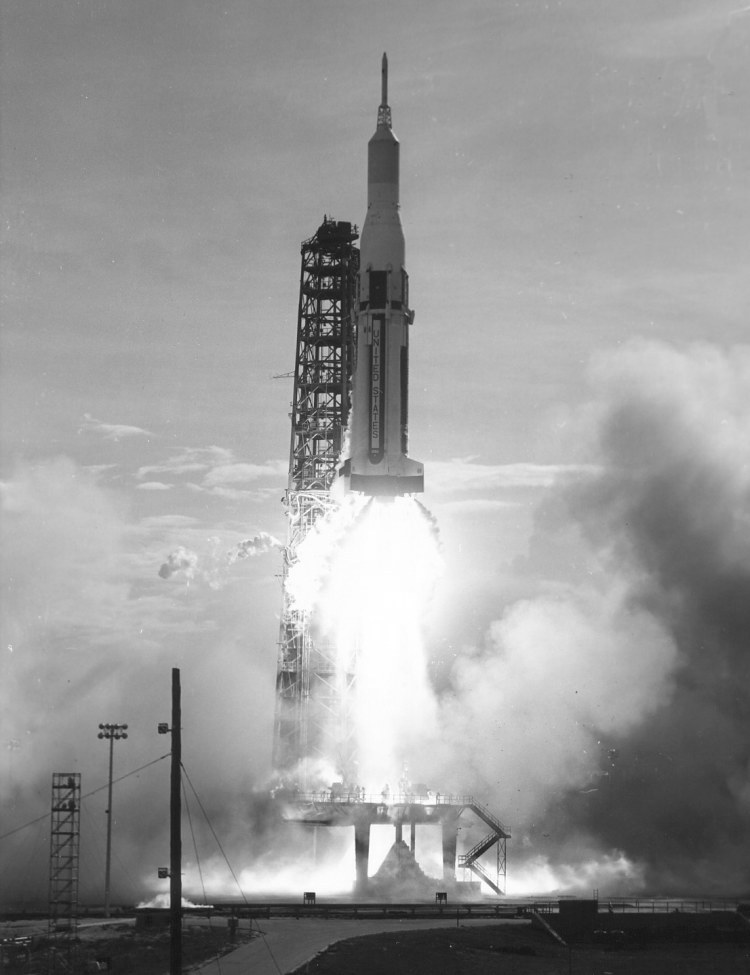
- Launch of SA-10 carrying AS-105
- Mission type: Spacecraft aerodynamics; micrometeoroid investigation
- Operator: NASA
- COSPAR ID: 1965-060B
- SATCAT no.: 1468
- Distance travelled: 912,064,090 kilometers (566,730,350 mi)
- Orbits completed: ~22,152

Spacecraft properties
- Spacecraft: Apollo BP-9; Pegasus 3
- Launch mass: 1,451 kilograms (3,199 lb)

Start of mission
- Launch date: July 30, 1965, 13:00:00 UTC
- Rocket: Saturn I SA-10
- Launch site: Cape Kennedy LC-37B

End of mission
- Decay date: November 22, 1975

Orbital parameters
- Reference system: Geocentric
- Regime: Low Earth orbit
- Perigee altitude: 521 kilometers (324 mi)
- Apogee altitude: 536 kilometers (333 mi)
- Inclination: 28.8 degrees
- Period: 95.2 minutes
- Epoch: 3 September 1965

AS-105 was the fifth and final orbital flight of a boilerplate Apollo spacecraft, and the third and final launch of a Pegasus micrometeoroid detection satellite. It was launched by SA-10, the tenth and final Saturn I rocket, in 1965.

== Overview ==
AS-105 was an Apollo boilerplate spacecraft; boilerplate BP-9A was used for the flight. The spacecraft reentered on November 22, 1975. The Saturn launch vehicle (SA-10) was similar to those of missions AS-103 and AS-104. As on the previous mission, the boilerplate service module was equipped with a test installation of a reaction control engine package.

The primary flight objective was to continue demonstration of the launch vehicle's iterative guidance mode and evaluation of system accuracy.

== Launch ==
AS-105 was launched from Cape Kennedy Launch Complex 37B at 08:00 EST (13:00 GMT) on July 30, 1965, on the last Saturn I rocket, SA-10. A planned thirty-minute hold ensured that launch time coincided with the opening of the Pegasus launch window. The launch was normal and the payload was inserted into orbit approximately 10.7 minutes after lift-off. The total mass placed in orbit, including the spacecraft, Pegasus spacecraft, adapter, instrument unit, and S-IV stage, was 34,438 pounds (15,621 kg).

The spacecraft was separated 812 seconds after lift-off and the separation and ejection system operated as planned. The Pegasus 3 spacecraft, which was attached to the S-IV stage of the Saturn I and stowed inside the boilerplate service module, was deployed 40 seconds after command initiation at 872 seconds. Pegasus 3 was a 1423.6 kilogram (3138.6 pound) micrometeoroid detection satellite, which was bolted to the S-IV.
