= Pegasus 3 =

American satellite

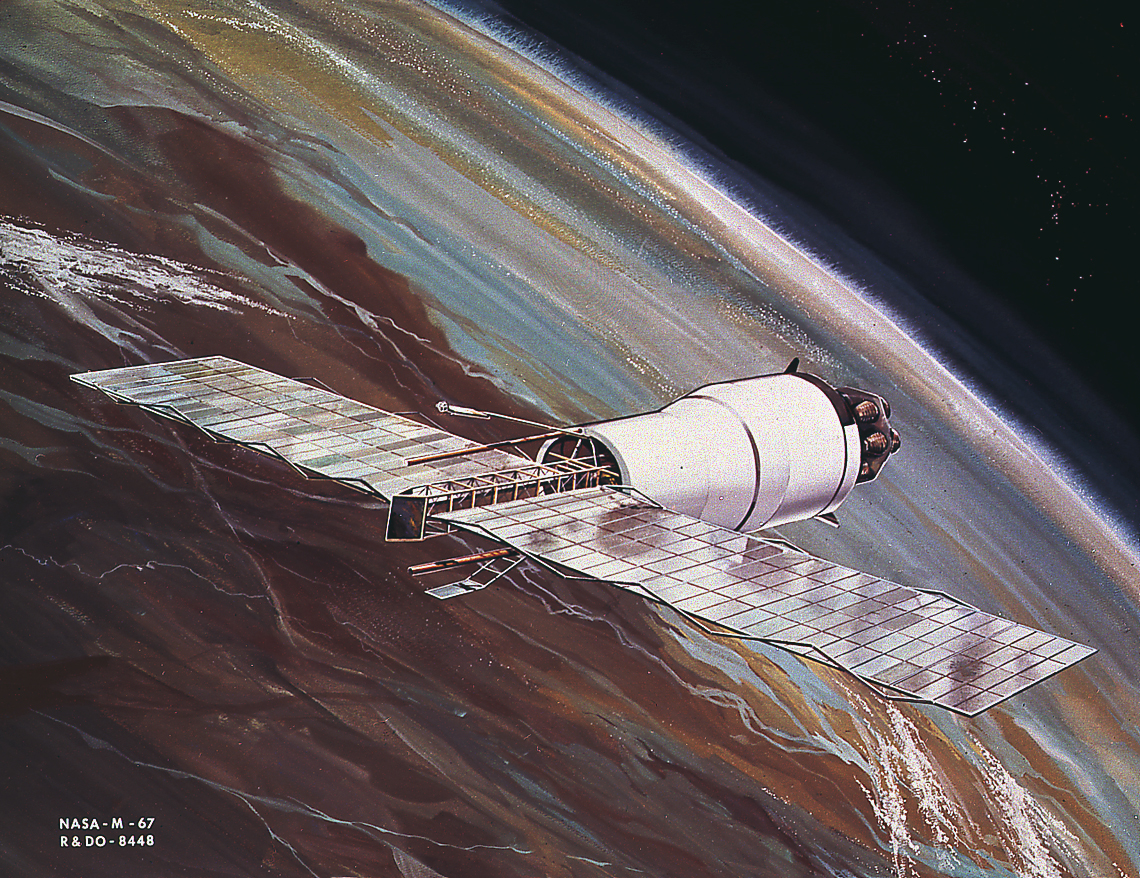
- A Pegasus satellite in orbit
- Operator: NASA
- COSPAR ID: 1965-060A
- SATCAT no.: 01467
- Mission duration: 1 year (design); 3 years (achieved)

Spacecraft properties
- Spacecraft type: Pegasus
- Manufacturer: Fairchild Hiller
- Launch mass: 10,323 kilograms (22,758 lb)
- Payload mass: 1,450 kilograms (3,200 lb)

Start of mission
- Launch date: 30 July 1965, 13:00:00 UTC
- Rocket: Saturn I SA-10
- Launch site: Cape Canaveral LC-37B

End of mission
- Disposal: Decommissioned
- Deactivated: 29 August 1968
- Decay date: 4 August 1969

Orbital parameters
- Reference system: Geocentric
- Regime: Low Earth
- Perigee altitude: 516 kilometers (321 mi)
- Apogee altitude: 536 kilometers (333 mi)
- Inclination: 28.8 degrees
- Period: 95.15 minutes
- Epoch: 3 September 1965

Pegasus 3 or III, also known as Pegasus C before launch, was an American satellite which was launched in 1965 to study micrometeoroid impacts in Low Earth orbit. It was the last of three Pegasus satellites to be launched, the previous two having been launched earlier the same year. It was manufactured by Fairchild Hiller, and operated by NASA.

== Spacecraft ==
Pegasus 3 was a Pegasus spacecraft, consisting of 1,450 kilograms (3,200 lb) of instruments, attached to the S-IV upper stage of the carrier rocket which had placed it into orbit. It had a total mass of 10,323 kilograms (22,758 lb), and was equipped with two sets of micrometeoroid detection panels, and a radio for tracking and returning data. The panels were 29 metres (95 ft) long, and equipped with 116 individual detectors.

== Launch ==
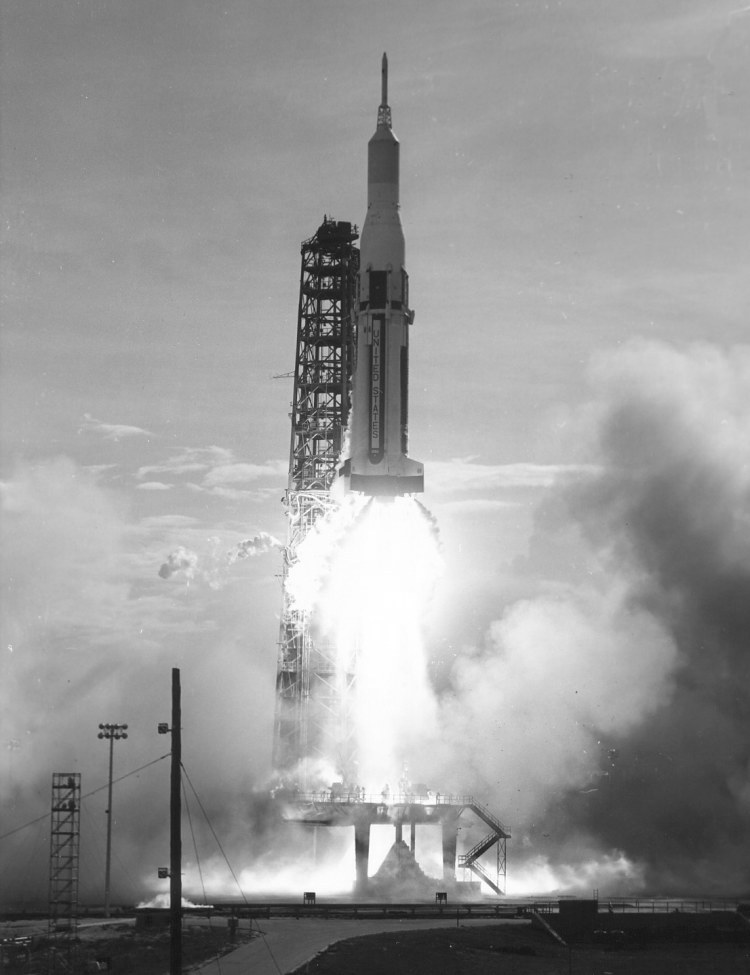
Launch of Saturn SA-10, carrying Apollo boilerplate spacecraft and Pegasus-3 satellite.

Pegasus 3 was launched atop a Saturn I rocket, serial number SA-10, flying from Launch Complex 37B at the Cape Kennedy Air Force Station. The launch occurred at 13:00:00 UTC on 30 July 1965. Following launch, Pegasus 3 was given the COSPAR designation 1965-060A, whilst NORAD assigned it the Satellite Catalog Number 01467.

Pegasus 3 was a secondary payload on the carrier rocket, which was carrying a boilerplate Apollo spacecraft, Apollo 105 or BP-9A, as part of a series of configuration tests for the Apollo program. The Apollo boilerplate acted as a payload fairing for the Pegasus spacecraft, which was stored inside what would have been the Service Module of a functional spacecraft. Upon reaching orbit, the boilerplate Command and Service modules were jettisoned.

== Operations ==
Pegasus 3 was operated in a low Earth orbit. On 3 September 1965 it was catalogued as being in an orbit with a perigee of 516 kilometers (279 nmi) and an apogee of 536 kilometers (289 nmi), inclined at 51.6 degrees to the equator and with a period of 95.15 minutes. Once in orbit, the panels were deployed to detect micrometeoroid impacts. Experiment results were returned to Earth by radio. The spacecraft operated until 29 August 1968, and subsequently remained in orbit until it decayed and reentered the atmosphere on 4 August 1969. It had originally only been expected to operate for 720 days.

== See also ==
- 1965 in spaceflight
