= Flying horses (disambiguation) =

Flying horses are horses that fly.

Flying horses or flying horse may refer to:

- Carousel, also sometimes known as "flying horses", an amusement ride
- Flying Horse of Gansu , a Chinese bronze statue
- Lipizzan, a European breed of riding horse renowned for its "airs above the ground"

== Places and facilities ==
- Flying Horse Walk, a shopping centre in Nottingham City Centre, Nottingham, England, UK
- Flying Horse Inn, a pub in Nottingham, England, UK
- Flying Horses Carousel, a carousel on Martha's Vineyard Island, Massachusetts, U.S.

== Music ==
- The Flying Horse Big Band, an American big band
- Flying Horse Records, an American record label
- Flying Horse: The Dawn of a Man, a 2014 EP by Velvet Moonlight
  - "Flying Horse", a song from the band's 2014 EP
- "Flying Horses", a song by Dispatch from the 1996 album Silent Steeples
- Flying Hórses, stage name of Canadian musician Jade Bergeron

== Other uses ==
- Flying Horse Royal Lager, a beer produced by the United Breweries Group

== See also ==
- Pegasus (disambiguation)
- Tianma (disambiguation)
- Winged horse (disambiguation)
- Winged unicorn, a unicorn that flies
