= AS-103 =

Third orbital flight test of a boilerplate Apollo spacecraft, February 16, 1965

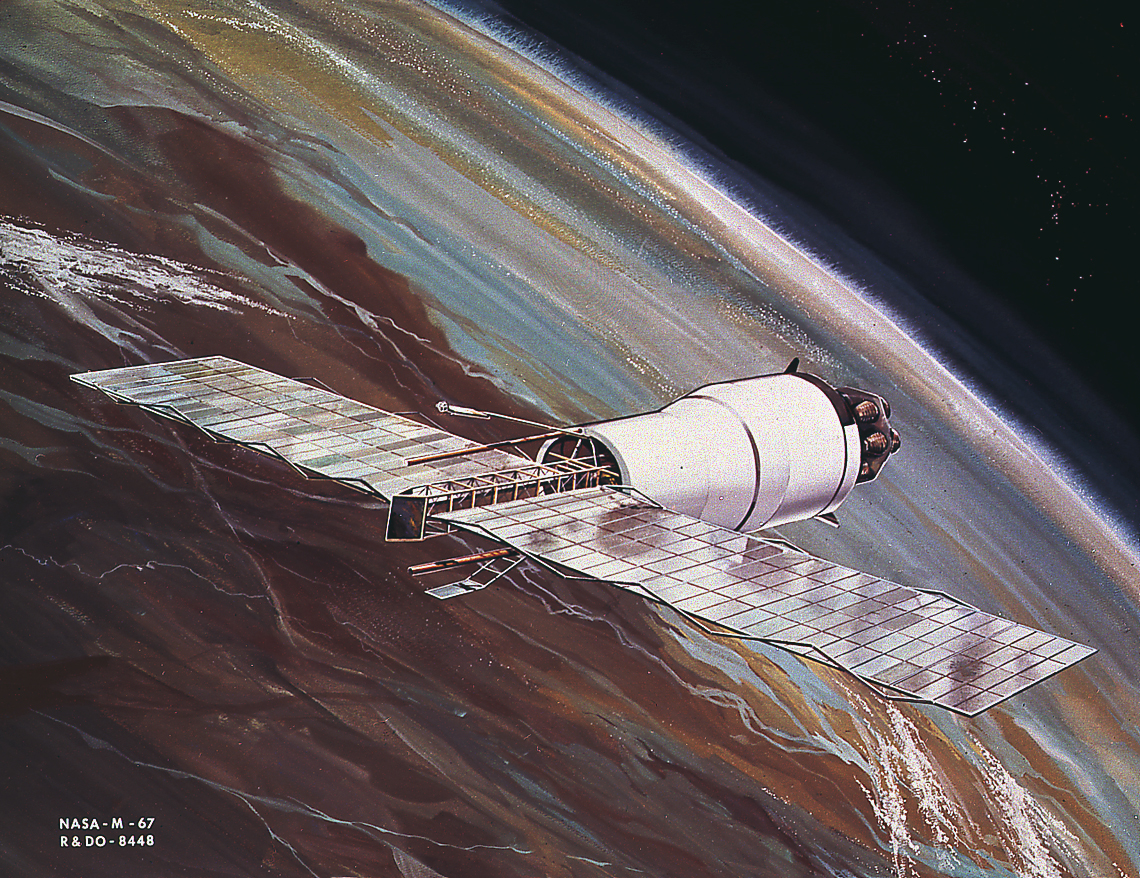
- Pegasus micrometeoroid detection satellite as flown aboard AS-103
- Mission type: Spacecraft aerodynamics; Micrometeoroid investigation
- Operator: NASA
- COSPAR ID: 1965-009B
- SATCAT no.: 1088
- Mission duration: 3 years, 6 months, 13 days
- Distance travelled: 3,114,579,139 kilometers (1.935309753×10^{9} mi)
- Orbits completed: ~75,918

Spacecraft properties
- Spacecraft: Apollo BP-16; Pegasus 1
- Launch mass: 15,375 kilograms (33,896 lb)

Start of mission
- Launch date: February 16, 1965, 14:37:03 UTC
- Rocket: Saturn I SA-9
- Launch site: Cape Kennedy LC-37B

End of mission
- Disposal: Decommissioned
- Deactivated: August 29, 1968
- Decay date: July 10, 1985

Orbital parameters
- Reference system: Geocentric
- Regime: Low Earth orbit
- Perigee altitude: 430 kilometers (270 mi)
- Apogee altitude: 523 kilometers (325 mi)
- Inclination: 31.7 degrees
- Period: 94.10 minutes
- Epoch: 22 March 1965

AS-103 was the third orbital flight test of a boilerplate Apollo spacecraft, and the first flight of a Pegasus micrometeoroid detection satellite. Also known as SA-9, it was the third operational launch of a two-stage Saturn I launch vehicle.

== Objectives ==
Of 12 flight objectives assigned, two were concerned with the operation of the Pegasus satellite, eight with launch vehicle systems performance, one with jettisoning the launch escape system, and one with separation of the boilerplate spacecraft. The satellite objectives were (1) demonstration of the functional operations of the mechanical, structural, and electronic systems and (2) evaluation of meteoroid data sampling in near-Earth orbit. Since the launch trajectory was designed to insert the Pegasus satellite into the proper orbit, it differed substantially from the trajectory used in missions AS-101 and AS-102.

== Launch ==
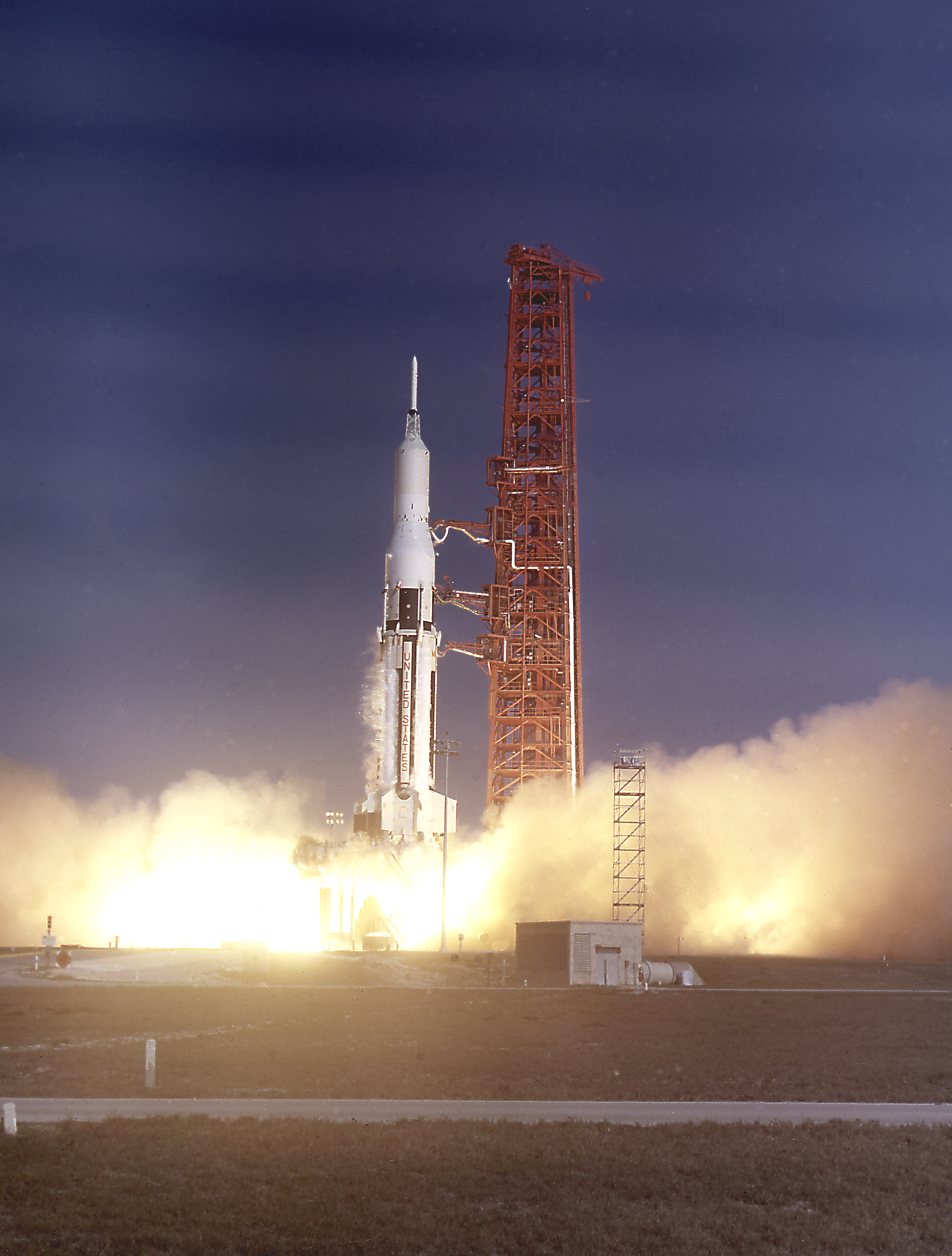
AS-103 (SA-9) launch

The launch vehicle consisted of an S-I first stage, an S-IV second stage, and an instrument unit. The spacecraft consisted of a boilerplate command and service module, a launch escape system, and a service module/launch vehicle adapter (BP-16). The Pegasus 1 satellite was enclosed within the service module, attached to the S-IV stage. The orbital configuration consisted of the satellite mounted on the adapter, which remained attached to the instrument unit and the expended S-IV stage.

The vehicle was launched from Cape Kennedy Launch Complex 37B at 9:37:03 a.m. EST (14:37:03 GMT) on February 16, 1965. A hold of 1 hour and 7 minutes was caused by a power failure in the Eastern Test Range flight safety computer. A built-in hold of 30 minutes was also used to discharge and recharge a battery in the Pegasus satellite as a check that it was functioning properly.

The launch was normal, and the spacecraft was inserted into orbit approximately 10.5 minutes after launch. The launch escape system was jettisoned during launch and the command module was jettisoned after orbital insertion. The Pegasus satellite weighed approximately 3,980 pounds (1,810 kg) and was 208 by 84 by 95 inches (5.3 by 2.1 by 2.4 m). The width of the deployed wings was 96 feet (29 m). The total mass placed in orbit was 33,895 pounds (15,375 kg). The perigee was 307.8 miles (495.4 km), the apogee was 461.9 miles (743.4 km), and the orbital inclination was 31.76°.

== Results ==
The trajectory and space-fixed velocity were very nearly as planned. The Apollo shroud separated from the Pegasus satellite about 804 seconds after lift-off, and deployment of two meteoroid detection panel wings of the Pegasus satellite commenced about 1 minute later. The predicted useful lifetime of Pegasus A in orbit was 1188 days. The satellite was commanded off (decommissioned) on August 29, 1968. Although minor malfunctions occurred in both the launch vehicle and the Pegasus A satellite, mission AS-103 was a success in that all objectives were met. The spacecraft remained in orbit until July 10, 1985, when it re-entered the atmosphere and landed in the ocean.
