= AS-104 =

1965 orbital test of a Apollo spacecraft

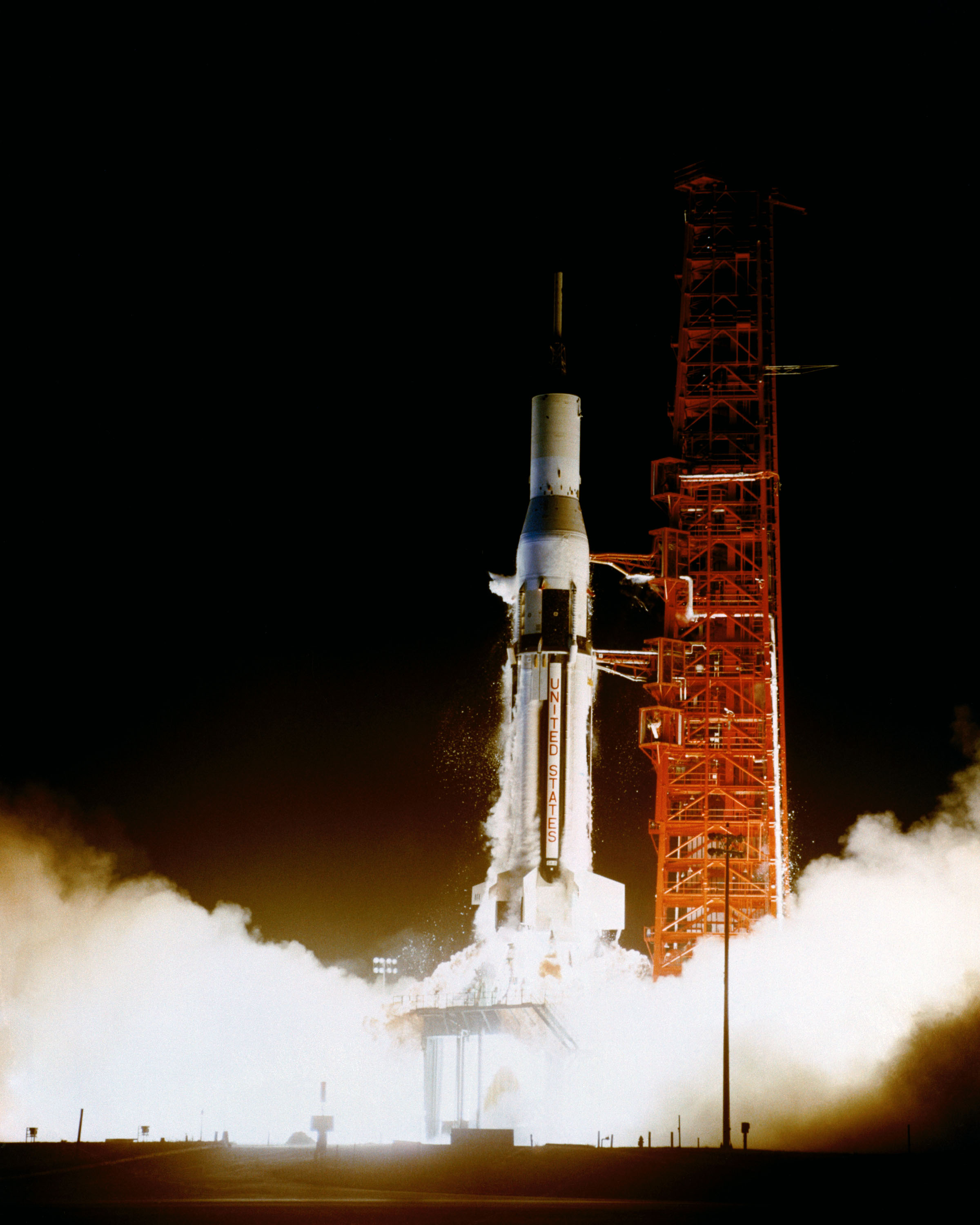
- Launch of Saturn AS-104
- Mission type: Spacecraft aerodynamics; micrometeoroid investigation
- Operator: NASA
- COSPAR ID: 1965-039B
- SATCAT no.: 1385
- Mission duration: 8,810 days
- Distance travelled: 3,282,050,195 kilometers (2.039371443×10^{9} mi)
- Orbits completed: ~79,790

Spacecraft properties
- Spacecraft: Apollo BP-26; Pegasus 2
- Launch mass: 1,451.5 kilograms (3,200 lb)

Start of mission
- Launch date: May 25, 1965, 07:35:01 UTC
- Rocket: Saturn I SA-8
- Launch site: Cape Kennedy LC-37B

End of mission
- Decay date: July 8, 1989

Orbital parameters
- Reference system: Geocentric
- Regime: Low Earth orbit
- Perigee altitude: 511 kilometers (318 mi)
- Apogee altitude: 739 kilometers (459 mi)
- Inclination: 31.7 degrees
- Period: 97.2 minutes
- Epoch: 4 July 1965

AS-104 was the fourth orbital test of a boilerplate Apollo spacecraft, and the second flight of the Pegasus micrometeoroid detection satellite. It was launched by SA-8, the ninth Saturn I carrier rocket.

== Objectives ==
The primary mission objective was to demonstrate the launch vehicle's iterative guidance mode and to evaluate system accuracy. The launch trajectory was similar to that of mission AS-103.

The Saturn launch vehicle SA-8 and payload were similar to those of mission AS-103, except that a single reaction control engine assembly was mounted on the boilerplate service module (BP-26). The assembly was instrumented to acquire additional data on launch environment temperatures. This assembly also differed from the one on the AS-101 mission in that two of the four engines were of a prototype configuration instead of all engines being simulated.

== Launch ==
This was the first nighttime launch in the Saturn I series. A built-in 35 minute hold was used to ensure that launch time coincided with the opening of the launch window.

AS-104 was launched from Cape Kennedy Launch Complex 37B at 2:35:01 a.m. EST (07:35:01 GMT) on May 25, 1965. The launch was normal and the payload was inserted into orbit approximately 10.6 minutes after lift-off. The total mass placed in orbit, including the spacecraft, Pegasus B, adapter, instrument unit, and S-IV stage, was 34,113 pounds (15,473 kg). The perigee and apogee were 314.0 and 464.1 miles (505 and 747 km), respectively; the orbital inclination was 31.78'. The 1397 kilogram (3080-pound) Pegasus 2 satellite was also carried to orbit by SA-8, being stowed inside the boilerplate's service module, and remaining attached to the S-IV stage.

The actual trajectory was close to the one predicted, and the spacecraft was separated 806 seconds after lift-off. Several minor malfunctions occurred in the S-I stage propulsion system; however, all mission objectives were achieved.
