= Winged horse (disambiguation) =

A winged horse is a horse with wings.

Winged horse may also refer to:

- The Winged Horse, a 1932 American animated short film
- Winged hussar, a Polish heavy cavalryman who wore wings as part of his uniform

== See also ==
- Flying horses (disambiguation)
- Pegasus (disambiguation)
- Tianma (disambiguation)
- Winged unicorn, a unicorn with wings
