= Pegasus 2 =

American satellite

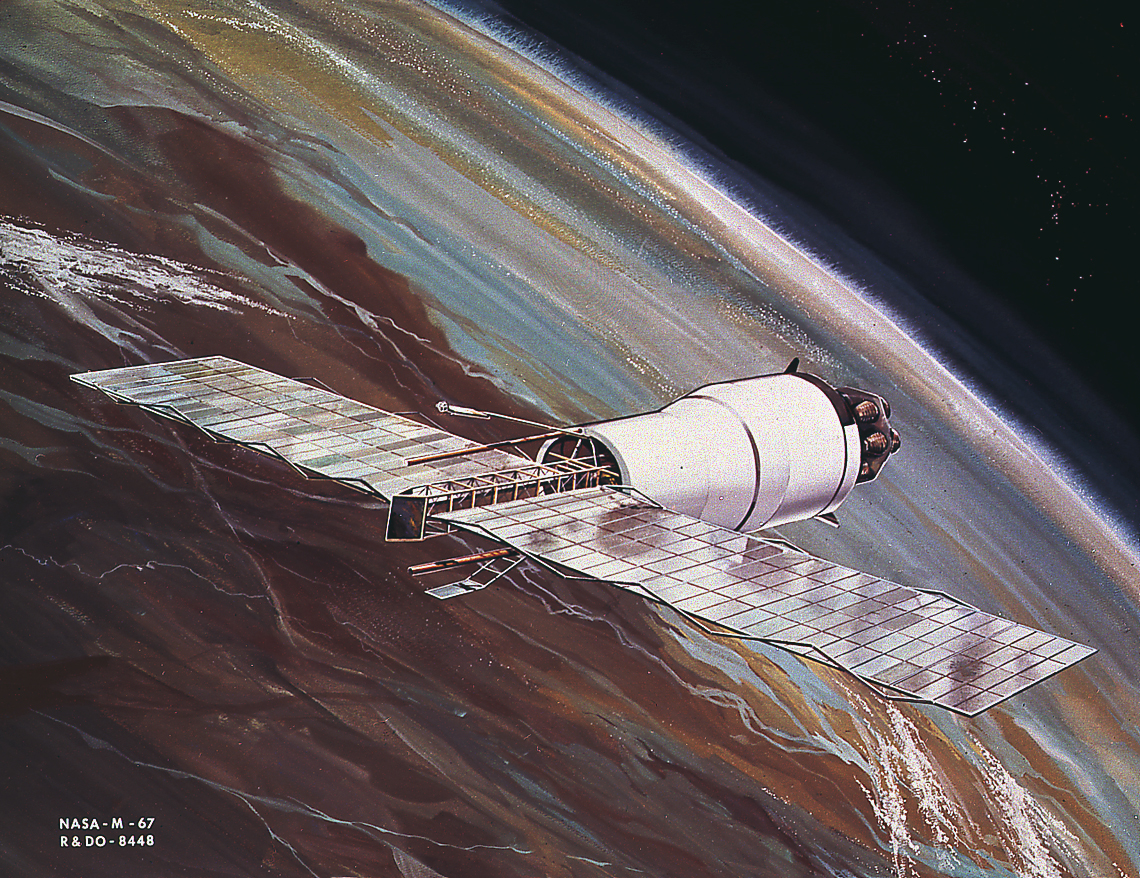
- A Pegasus satellite in orbit
- Operator: NASA
- COSPAR ID: 1965-039A
- SATCAT no.: 01381
- Mission duration: 1 year (design); 3 1/4 years (achieved)

Spacecraft properties
- Spacecraft type: Pegasus
- Manufacturer: Fairchild Hiller
- Launch mass: 9,058 kilograms (19,969 lb)
- Payload mass: 1,450 kilograms (3,200 lb)

Start of mission
- Launch date: 25 May 1965, 07:35:01 UTC
- Rocket: Saturn I SA-8
- Launch site: Cape Canaveral LC-37B

End of mission
- Disposal: Decommissioned
- Deactivated: 29 August 1968
- Decay date: 3 November 1979

Orbital parameters
- Reference system: Geocentric
- Regime: Low Earth
- Perigee altitude: 508 kilometers (316 mi)
- Apogee altitude: 737 kilometers (458 mi)
- Inclination: 31.7 degrees
- Period: 97.15 minutes
- Epoch: 3 July 1965

Pegasus 2 or Pegasus II, known before launch as Pegasus B was an American satellite which was launched in 1965 to study micrometeoroid impacts in Low Earth orbit. It was the second of three Pegasus satellites to be launched, following the launch of Pegasus 1 three months earlier. The Pegasus spacecraft were manufactured by Fairchild Hiller, and operated by NASA.

== Spacecraft ==
Pegasus 2 was a Pegasus spacecraft, consisting of 1,450 kilograms (3,200 lb) of instruments, attached to the S-IV upper stage of the carrier rocket which had placed it into orbit. It had a total mass of 9,058 kilograms (19,969 lb), and was equipped with two sets of micrometeoroid detection panels, and a radio for tracking and returning data. The panels were 29 metres (95 ft) long, and equipped with 116 individual detectors.

== Launch ==
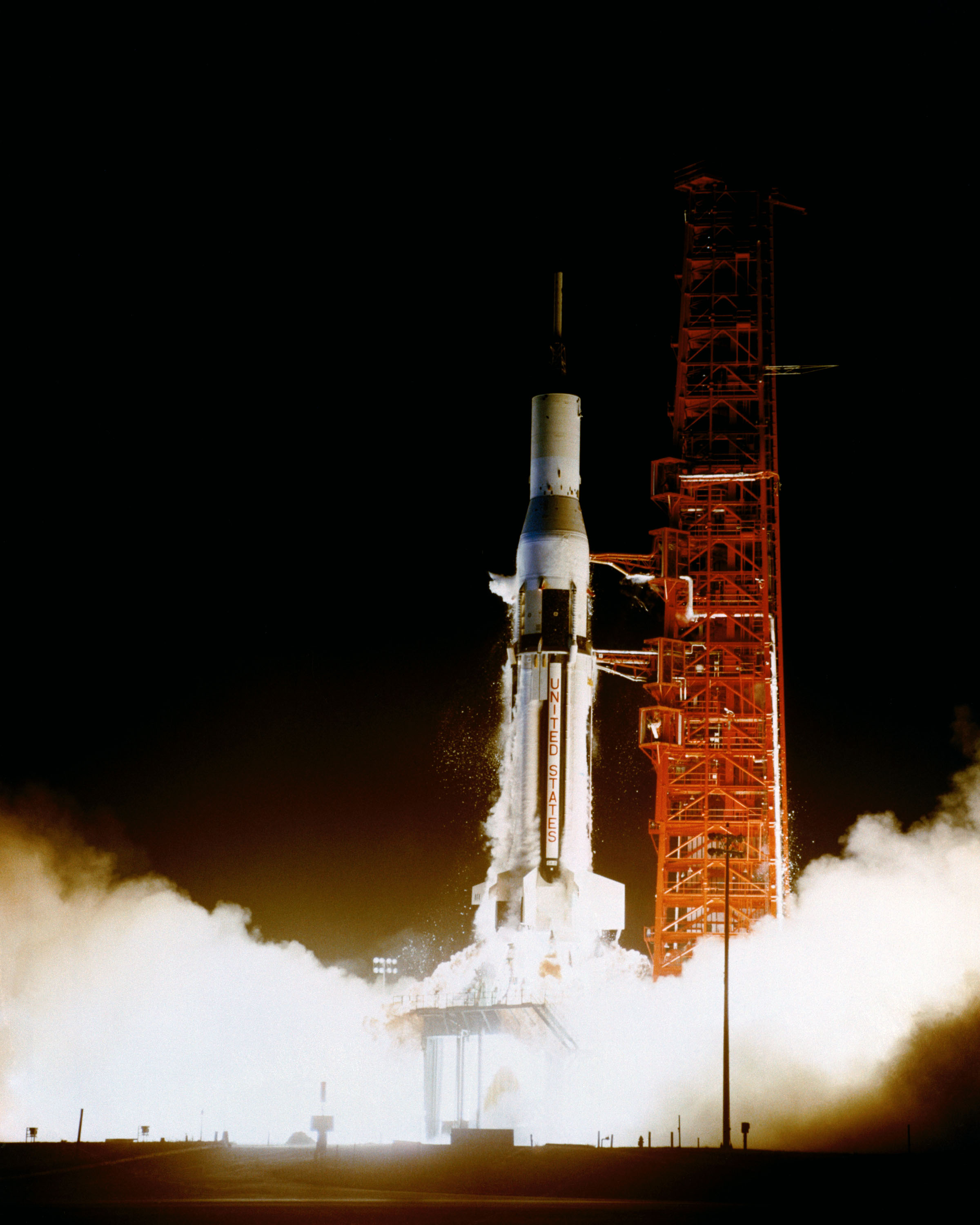
The launch of Pegasus 2

Pegasus 2 was launched atop a Saturn I rocket, serial number SA-8, flying from Launch Complex 37B at the Cape Kennedy Air Force Station. The launch occurred at 07:35:01 UTC on 25 May 1965. Following launch, Pegasus 2 was given the COSPAR designation 1965-039A, whilst NORAD assigned it the Satellite Catalog Number 01381.

Pegasus 2 was a secondary payload on the carrier rocket, which was carrying a boilerplate Apollo spacecraft, Apollo 104 or BP-26, as part of a series of configuration tests for the Apollo program. The Apollo boilerplate acted as a payload fairing for the Pegasus spacecraft, which was stored inside what would have been the Service Module of a functional spacecraft. Upon reaching orbit, the boilerplate Command and Service modules were jettisoned. Boilerplate separation occurred 806 seconds after liftoff, with Pegasus 2's detectors being deployed one minute later. The predicted orbital lifetime of Pegasus 2 was 1220 days.

== Operations ==
Pegasus 2 was operated in a low Earth orbit. On 3 July 1965 it was catalogued as being in an orbit with a perigee of 508 kilometers (274 nmi) and an apogee of 737 kilometers (398 nmi), inclined at 31.7 degrees to the equator and with a period of 97.15 minutes. Once in orbit, the panels were deployed to detect micrometeoroid impacts. Experiment results were returned to Earth by radio. The spacecraft operated until 29 August 1968, and subsequently remained in orbit until it decayed and reentered the atmosphere on 3 November 1979.

== See also ==
- 1965 in spaceflight
