= Olde Hansa =

Restaurant in Tallinn

Coordinates: 59°26′11.9″N 24°44′45.2″E

Logo of Olde Hansa

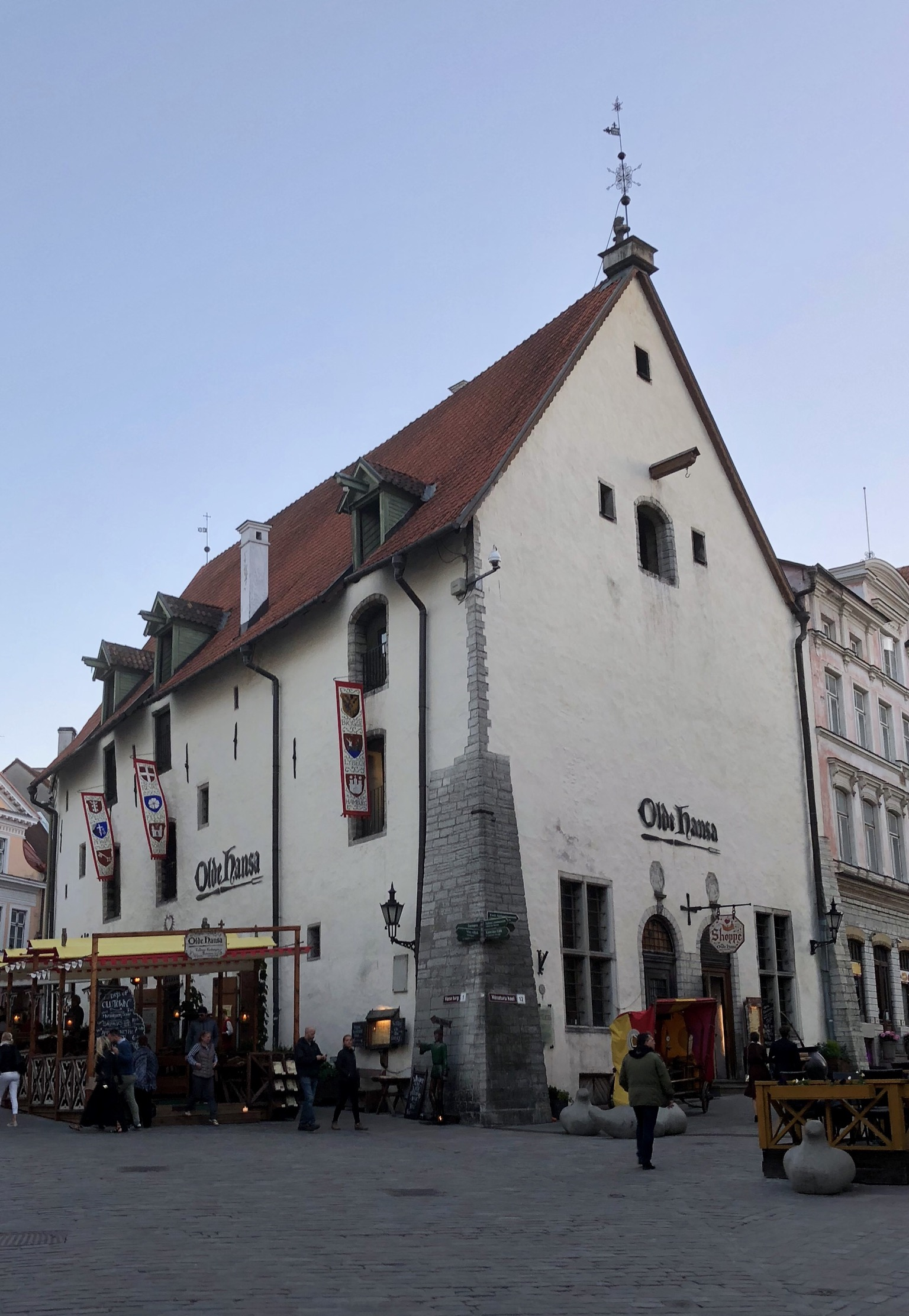
The Pakkhoone building where the restaurant is located

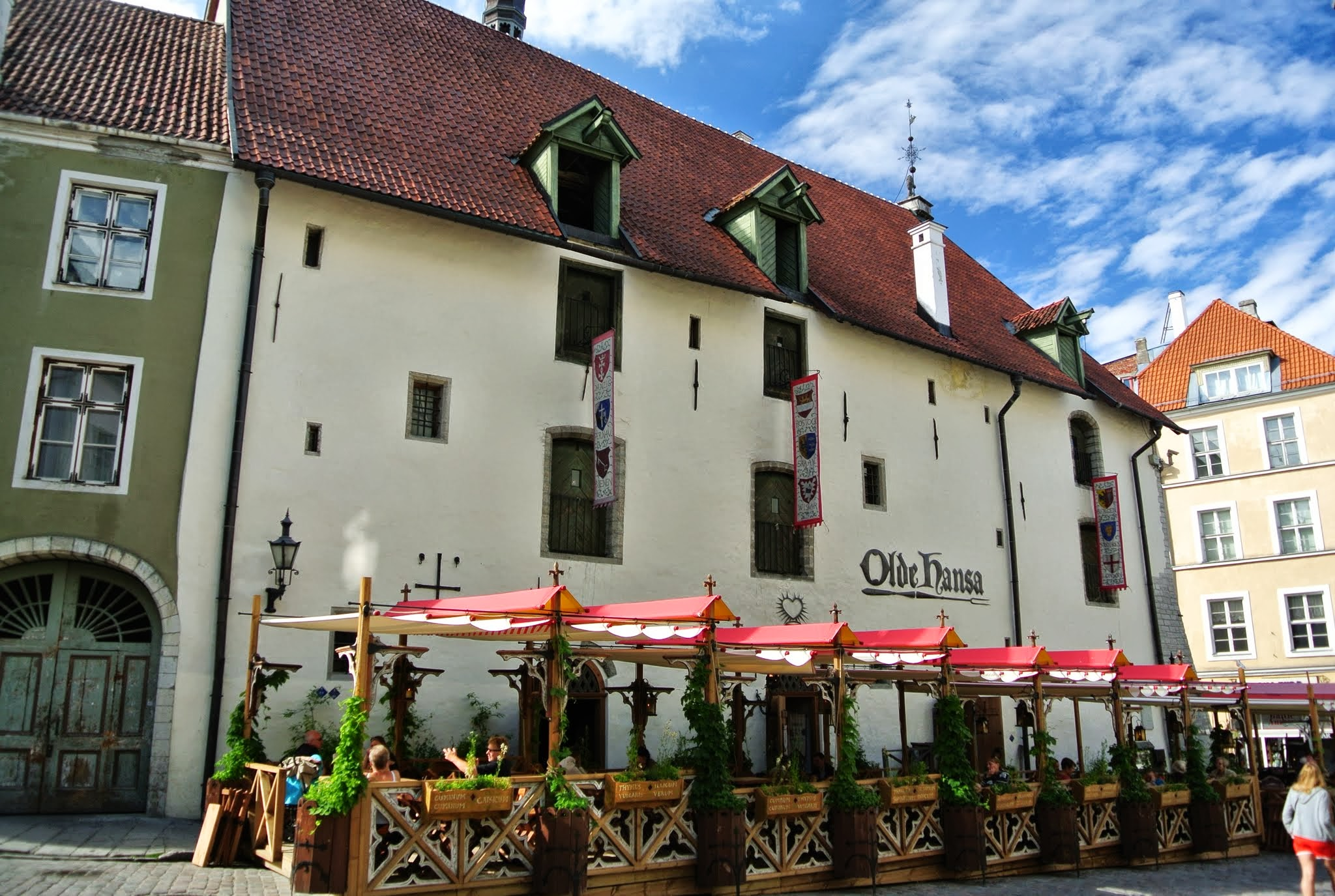
View from the east

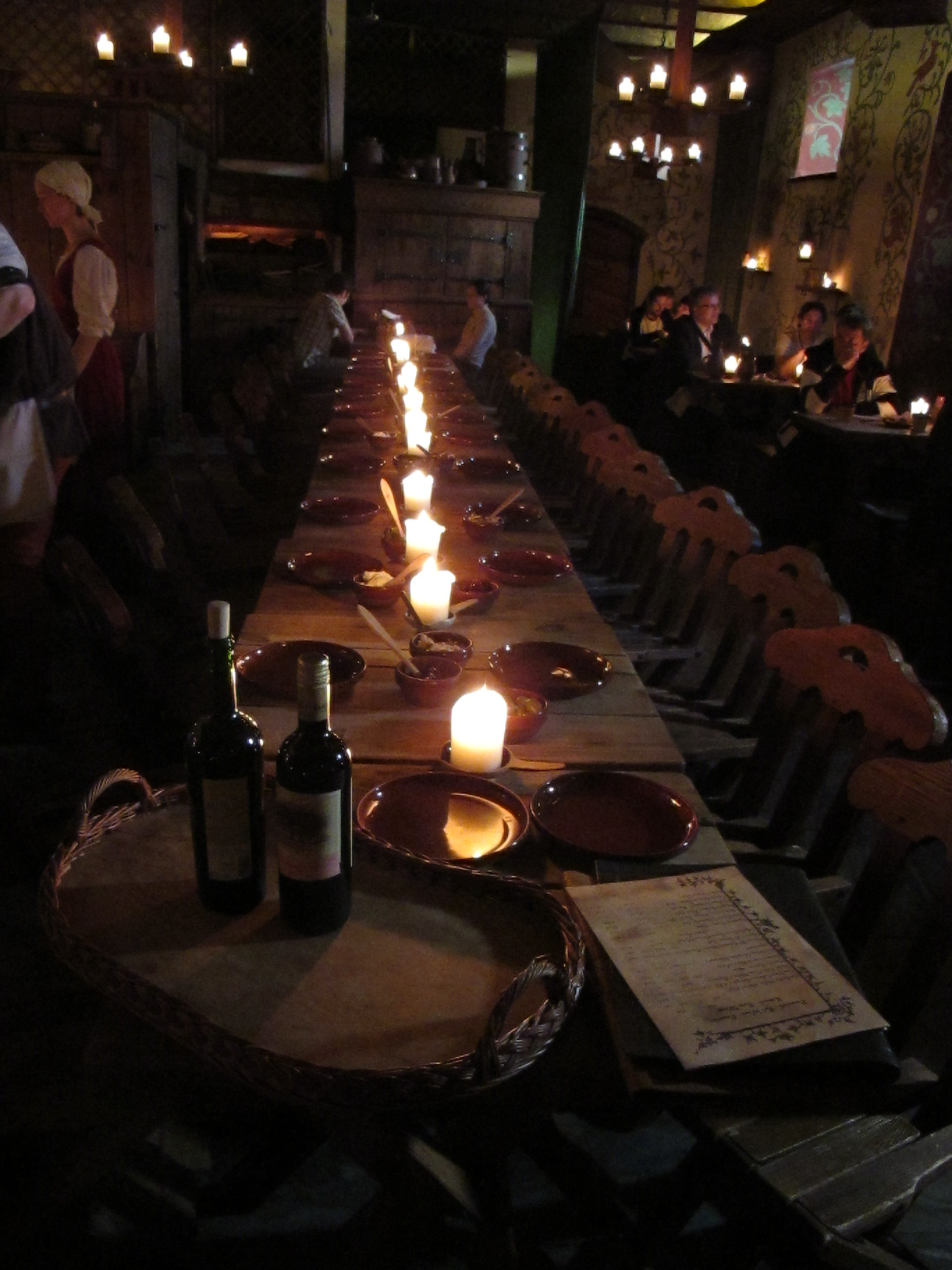
Interior of the restaurant

Olde Hansa is a restaurant in the Old Town in central Tallinn, Estonia, located in the protected Pakkhoone building.

== Location ==
The restaurant is located in the Old Town west of the Vana turg market square at the address Vana turg 1. The restaurant is located at a corner of the Vanaturu kael street bordering the Vana turg square to the north.

== Architecture and history ==
The building is part of the cultural heritage of Tallinn and consists of three old storerooms. The storeroom at the corner of the street collapsed in 1654 and was rebuilt from 1655 to 1657. At that time the three storerooms were connected into a single baroque style building. Baroque portals and stone slabs were built into the facade. A large cellar was built at the basement of the new building, supported by support beams. The building was heated. A stairway connected the old and new parts of the building.

In the latter half of the 17th century, the building served as a storeroom for foreign products sold on the market.

Despite a partial renovation in the 19th and 20th century, the original outside facade of the building was kept intact.

On 15 April 1997 the building was added to the Estonian register of cultural heritage as building number 3096.

== Restaurant Olde Hansa ==
The restaurant Olde Hansa with 300 customer places was opened in the building in 1997, becoming one of the most famous tourist destinations in Tallinn. The style of the restaurant, including the food and drink, the cutlery and the dress of the staff in the three-floor restaurant were modelled after the Hanseatic League. Original recipes of the Hanseatic time were used, without ingredients introduced to Europe in the 15th century or later. For example the recipes do not use any potato or maize. Instead there are many game dishes, including elk, bear and pheasant. The drinks include house beer and pepper schnapps. There is a furnace room on the third floor.

A shop selling mediaeval items was opened in the restaurant in 2005. It was closed in 2024, however, to have more seats due to rise in demand.
