= Sfäär =

Restaurant in Tallinn, Estonia

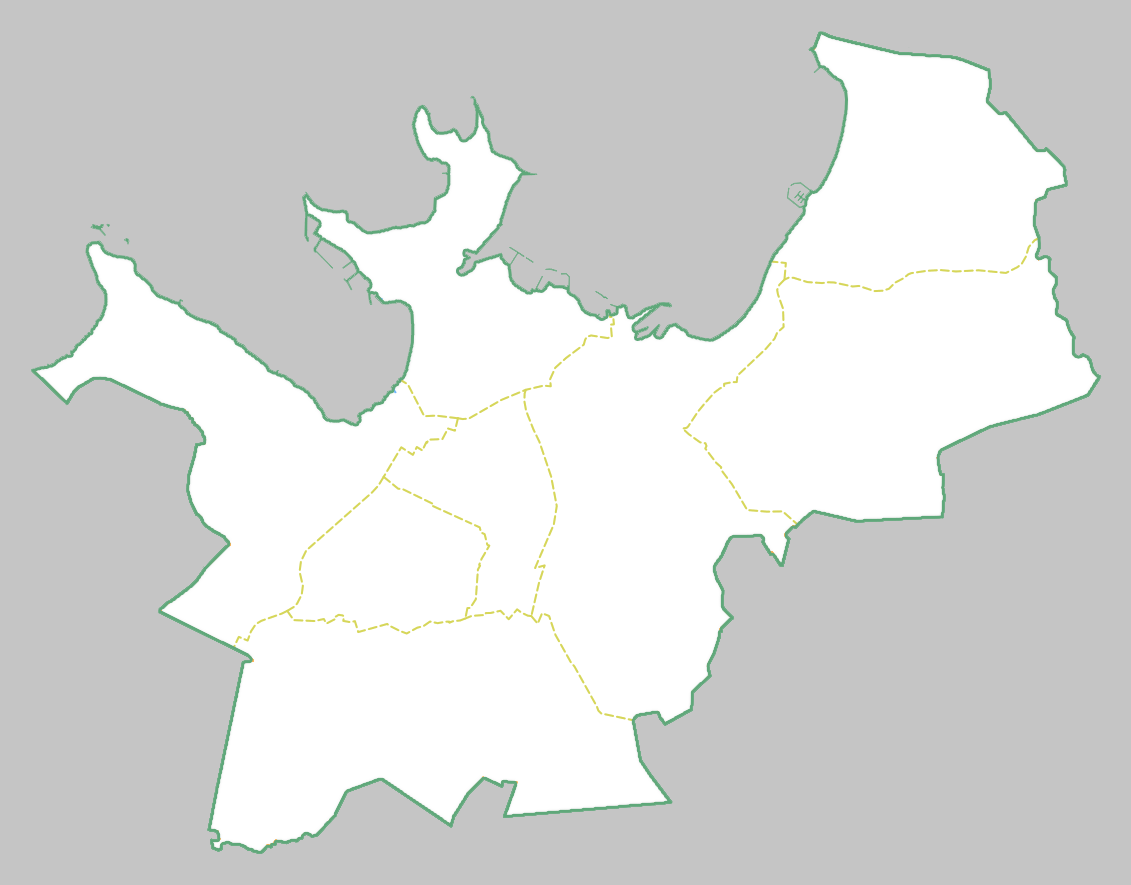
- Location in Tallinn

Restaurant information
- Food type: Nordic cuisine, Italian cuisine, Estonian cuisine
- Location: Tallinn, Estonia
- Coordinates: 59°26′23″N 24°45′5″E
- Website: www.sfaar.ee

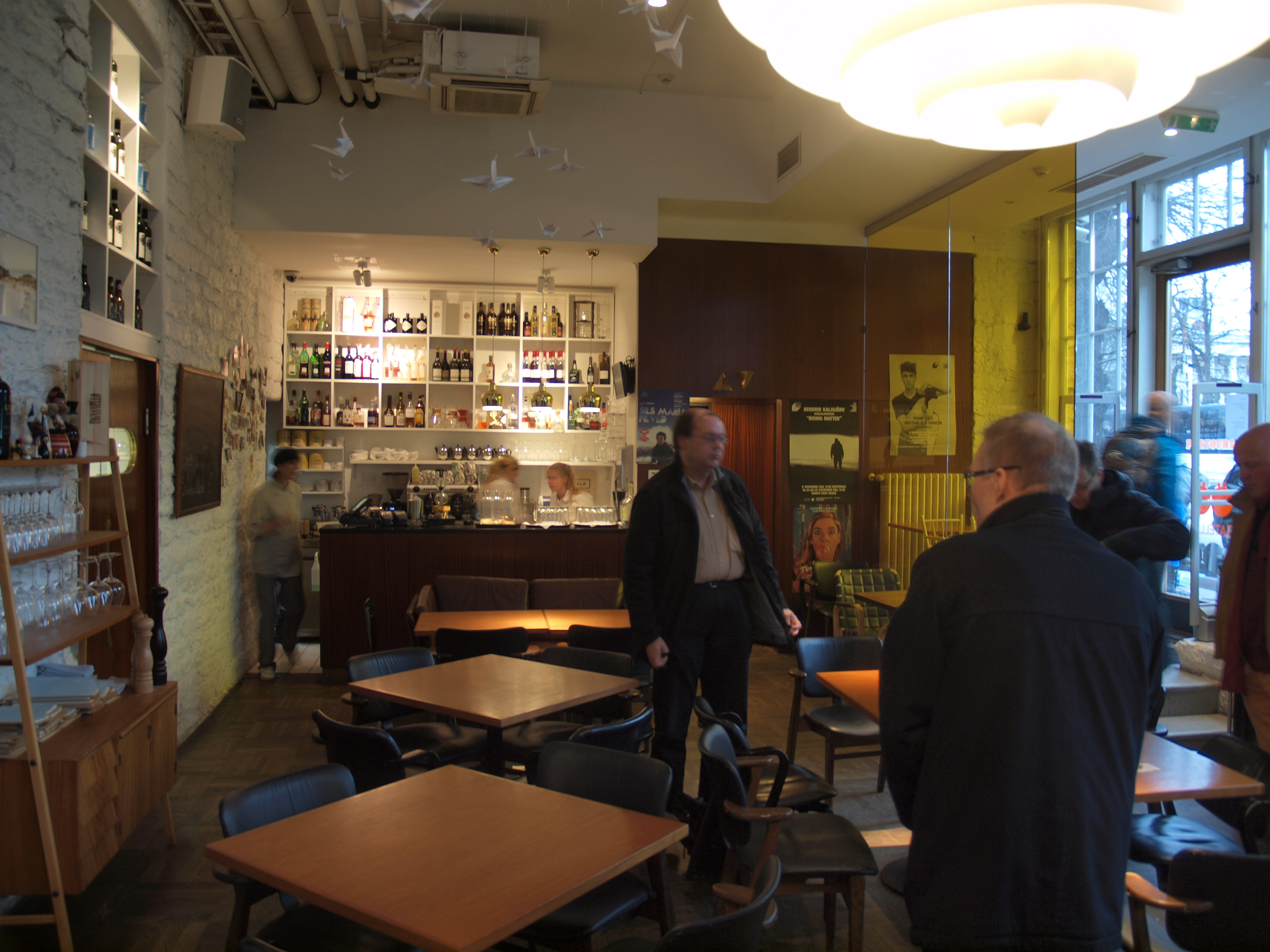
Interior of Sfäär.

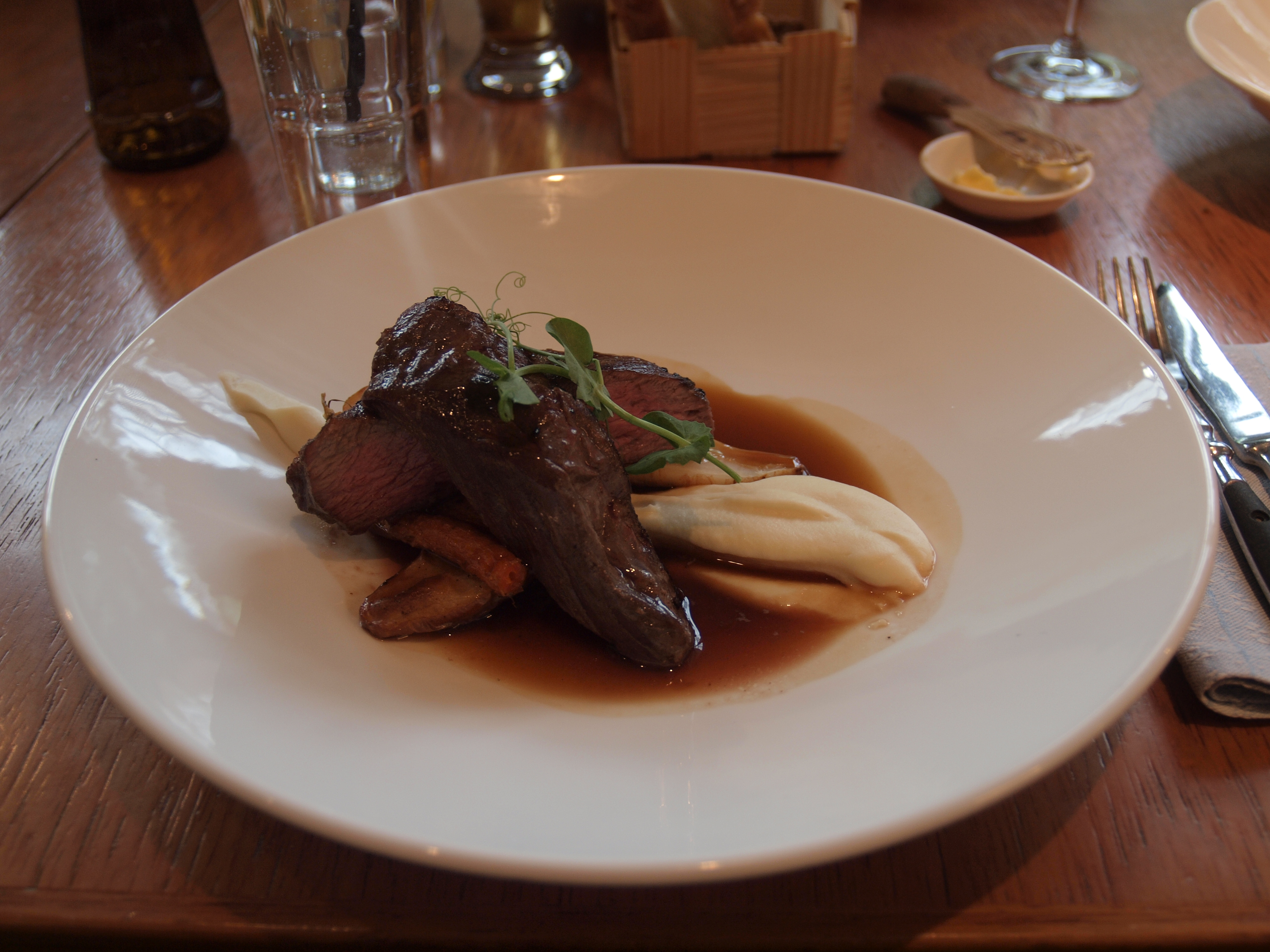
A veal dish in Sfäär.

Sfäär (meaning Sphere) was a restaurant and store located at Mere puiestee 6E, in Tallinn, Estonia. It was noted for its Nordic cuisine and New Estonian cuisine with Italian influence, using fresh ingredients. The restaurant was described as "kind of a cross between an old Soviet-era cafeteria and a stylishly retro second living room." The restaurant is also a wine store and clothes store which sells designer jeans and other goods. One review said of the restaurant: "Italian and Nordic aren't exactly terms that get along well. Yet by some stroke of insane genius, Sfäär found a way to force these to into a fusion. The result was a truly modern cuisine, presented in a contemporary and sleek setting with some tastefully incorporated retro elements." Sfäär closed down in August 2019.
