= Pigs Can Fly =

Pigs Can Fly may refer to:

- "Pigs Can Fly", an episode of Piggy Tales
- Pigs Can Fly (song), a song by pop-punk band Busted
  - Pigs Can Fly Tour 2016, a concert tour by the same group
