= Tianma (disambiguation) =

Tianma (天馬; English: Heavenly Horse) is the Chinese mythological version of the pegasus.

Tianma may also refer to:

- Tianma Tea House, Datong, Taipei, Taiwan
- Shanghai Tianma Circuit, the Tianma motor racing circuit of Shanghai, China
- Gansu Tianma, the Tianma soccer club from Gansu, China
- Tianma Wan (English: Pegasus pill), a traditional Chinese medicine
- Sky Horse (Chinese: 天馬飛彈; pinyin: Tiānmǎ Fēidàn; lit. 'Sky Horse Missile'), a Taiwanese ballistic missile
- Baolong Pegasus (Chinese: 天馬座; pinyin: Tiānmǎ-zuò; lit. 'Pegasus'), a Chinese MPV-minivan
- Gastrodia elata (Chinese: 天麻; pinyin: Tiānmá), an herb used in traditional Chinese medicine

== See also ==
- Tianma chafang (disambiguation)
- Tian (disambiguation)
- Ma (disambiguation)
