= Kim Sa-ryang =

North Korean writer (1914–1950)

Kim Sa-ryang (Korean: 김사량; Hanja: 金史良; 3 March 1914 – 1950) was a Korean writer. He wrote in a variety of genres including novels, plays, reports, and reviews, in two languages, Korean and Japanese. His career as a writer first began in Japan after publishing a short story written in Japanese, and his Korean-written works were later published in Korea. For his short story "Bit soge (빛 속에, Into the Light)," written in Japanese, he became the first Korean to be nominated for the Akutagawa Prize. He went to China in 1945 to join the army fighting for Korea's liberation. After the country's independence, he mostly lived and wrote in North Korea and died in 1950 during the Korean War.

== Life ==
=== Before the 1940s ===
Kim was born into a wealthy family in Pyongyang in 1914. While he was studying at Pyongyang High School, he led a strike against Japan for which he was expelled from school. He moved to Japan in 1932, graduated Saga High School, and got into Tokyo Imperial University in 1936 to study German literature. In university, he published a short story entitled "Toseongnang (토성랑, The Shantytown near the Earthen Ramparts)" in the second volume of the literary coterie magazine River Bank, adapted it into a play, and performed it with the Joseon Art Group. However, the performance caused trouble and he was in detention with other members of the group for two months. In 1938, he took part in the performance of Chunhyangjeon (춘향전, The Story of Chunhyang) in Joseon, organized by the drama company Sinhyeop. Kim submitted his thesis about Heinrich Heine and graduated university in 1939. After the graduation, he briefly worked as a journalist for the Chosun Ilbo. He published the short story "Into the Light," and also translated and introduced into Japanese many Korean literary works, such as "Mumyeong (무명, Absence of Light)," a short story written by Yi Kwang-su.

=== The 1940s ===
In 1940, Kim Sa-ryang became the first Korean author to be nominated for the Akutagawa Prize, for his short story "Into the Light." He started publishing serially his novel Nakjo (낙조, Falling) in Korean from 1940 to 1941. Also, his Japanese-written short stories "Cheonma (천마, Heavenly Horse)" and "Pulsup gipsugi (풀숲 깊숙이, Far into the Grassland)" came out in 1940, and "Hyangsu (향수, Homesick)" in 1941. In the same year, his first short story collection Into the Light was published in Japan. He wrote stories in Korean as well, such as "Yuchijang-eseo mannan sanai (유치장에서 만난 사나이, The Man I Met in Jail)," published in 1941. During the Pacific War, he was in detention for 50 days, forced to follow the Japanese military on the frontlines of the Southeast Asia and to write about them, but he refused to the end. In 1942, he published "Sipjang kkopsae (십장 꼽새, The Chief Worker, Mr. Hunchback)" and the short story collection Gohyang (고향, Hometown). In the same year, Kim returned to his hometown and researched the conditions of the slash-and-burn farming villages, and published the novels Taebaek sanmaek (태백산맥, The Taebaek Mountains) and Badaui norae (바다의 노래, Songs of the Sea) in 1943. He was sent to China in 1945 as a member of the group organized to entertain student soldiers, but he escaped to the Taihang mountain in Yan'an, China. Later, he joined the Alliance for Joseon Liberation in North China, and wrote the play Hojeop (호접, Tiger Swallowtail) while fighting against Japan. On hearing the news of Japan's defeat on August 15, 1945, he returned to his home country as the advance party of the Korean Volunteer Army. He participated in a roundtable talk of writers held in Seoul and the inaugural meeting of the Literary Alliance of Joseon.

=== After the independence of Korea ===
While publishing serially Yeonan mangmyeonggi (연안망명기, Living in Exile in Yan'an), whose title was later changed to Noma Malli (노마 만리, The Slow Horse Goes Four Thousand Kilometers), Kim moved to North Korea and became a major member of culture and arts organizations. He left a number of works, including his plays Noeseong (뇌성, Thunder), published in 1946, and Daeoneun taeyangeul hyanghayeo (대오는 태양을 향하여, The Ranks Go Towards the Sun), in 1950. Then he took part in the Korean War as one of the war writers and wrote reports like "Seoul-eseo suwon-euro (서울에서 수원으로, From Seoul to Suwon)" and "Urineun ireoke igyeotda (우리는 이렇게 이겼다, This Is How We Won)." He reportedly died of a heart attack near Wonju, in October 1950, after finishing his last work, the report on war Badaga boinda (바다가 보인다, I See the Ocean). His works have been translated and introduced in not only Japan and Korea, but also China and the U.S. In 2005, a monument commemorating Kim's literary legacy was erected at the entrance of the village of Hujiazhuang in China.

== Writing ==
=== Style ===
Many of Kim's works vividly depict the reality of Korea and its situation as a Japanese colony. He wrote predominantly in Japanese, but he focused on the reality of the colonized country, explored the identity of the Korean people, and criticized the Japanese colonization. Also, he prolifically wrote in and translated into both Korean and Japanese, showing a strong commitment to his bilingualism.

=== Major works ===
His short story "Into the Light," written in Japanese and published in 1939, is one of the major works of Kim's early career. Focusing on the internal conflict of the protagonist Haruo, born to a Japanese father and a Korean mother, the story deals with Korean residents in Japan. The narrator of the story, who acts like a Japanese, and Haruo, who denies his Korean heritage, reveal their true identities at the end. "Into the Light" is significant as it posed the question of ethnic identity during the last period of the colonization when the Japanese government tried to assimilate the Koreans, and as it supported the ideology that 'Korean things' that can never be assimilated.

Beginning in the time when Japan invaded the country and culminating in the March First Movement of 1919, the Korean-language novel Nakjo, published from 1940 to 1941, recounts the story of the family of Yun Seong-hyo, a descendant of a high ranking, corrupt official. The title Nakjo, meaning falling, refers to the fall of corrupt, pro-Japanese influences who originally served as the officials of the Joseon's feudal system. The novel describes different aspects of a colonized society and it deals with the family of the pro-Japanese official who is apprehensive about the vengeance of independence activists. It also successfully captures the beauty of the Korean language by implementing the dialect of Pyongyang, traditional pansori songs, onomatopoeic and mimetic words.

The travel report Noma malli, which came out in 1946 after the country's independence, documents his personal experience of escaping to Yan'an in China and joining the Korean Volunteer Army; it also serves as a historical material of great import about the activism against Japan carried out in China during the last period of the colonization. "Noma" in the title means a slow horse and is a humble expression suggesting that the author joined the activism against Japan too late. This report is another example of a cultural resistance against Japanese imperialism, and its narrator refuses to give up hope for the home country and Asia in such harsh realities. Through this work, Kim suggests that his escape was a way to fight against Japan and to ensure his freedom to write, and also one of his attempts to realize utopia.

=== Critical reception ===
Kim received diverse criticisms in South and North Korea and the literary world of the Korean Japanese. In the latter, he was categorized as a writer of proletarian literature and became well known after his nomination for the Akutagawa Prize. In North Korea, his name was erased in the literary history because he was from the Yeonan (Yan'an in Chinese) group, which stood against Kim Il Sung, until he was reinstated in 1987 and reevaluated as a conscientious nationalist. In South Korea, he was hardly acknowledged since he moved to North Korea and wrote in Japanese; however, after the 1990s, critics enthusiastically acclaimed him for his bilingual and post colonialist writing.

== Bibliography ==
=== Complete collections and anthologies ===
==== Japan ====
《김사량 전집》(전 4권), 하출서방신사, 1973~1974 / Kim sa-ryang jeonjip jeon 4 gwon (Complete Collection of Kim Sa-ryang's Works in Four Volumes), Kawade Shobo Shinsha, 1973–1974

《김사량 작품집》, 이론사 (Tokyo), 1954 / Kim sa-ryang jakpumjip (Selected Works of Kim Sa-ryang), Rironsha (Tokyo), 1954

==== Korea ====
《김사량 선집》, 국립출판사(평양), 1955 / Kim sa-ryang seonjip (Kim Sa-ryang Anthology), Guklip (Pyeongyang), 1955

《김사량 작품집》, 문예출판사(평양), 1987 / Kim sa-ryang jakpumjip (Selected Works of Kim Sa-ryang), Munye (Pyeongyang), 1987

《김사량, 작품과 연구》, 김재용‧곽형덕, 역락, 2008–2016 / Kim sa-ryang, jakpumgwa yeongu (Study and Selected Works of Kim Sa-ryang), Kim Jae-yong, Gwak Hyeongduk, Youkrack Books, 2008–2016

《김사량 작품선》, 글누림, 2011 / Kim sa-ryang jakpumseon (Selected Works of Kim Sa-ryang), Geulnurim, 2011

《김사량 작품집》, 임헌영 엮음, 지식을만드는지식, 2013 / Kim sa-ryang jakpumjip (Selected Works of Kim Sa-ryang), edited by Lim Heonyeong, Zmanz Books, 2013

《김사량 선집》, 역락, 2016 / Kim sa-ryang seonjip (Kim Sa-ryang Anthology), Youkrack Books, 2016

=== Short story collections ===
==== Japan ====
《빛 속에》, 소산서점(도쿄), 1940 / Bit soge (Into the Light), Sosan Seojeom (Tokyo), 1940

《고향》, 갑조서림(교토), 1942 / Gohyang (Hometown), Gapjo Seorim (Kyoto), 1942

==== Korea ====
《풍상》, 조선인민출판사, 1948 / Pungsang (Wind and Frost), Joseon Inmin, 1948

《종군기》, 김재남 엮음, 살림터, 1992 / Jonggun-gi (Reports on the Korean War), edited by Kim Jaenam, Sallimteo, 1992

《빛 속으로》, 소담출판사, 2001 / Bit sogeuro (Into the Light), Sodam Books, 2001

=== Novels ===
==== Japan ====
《노마만리》, 조일신문사, 1972 / Noma Malli (The Slow Horse Goes Four Thousand Kilometers), Asahi Shimbun, 1972

==== Korea ====
《노마천리》, 양서각(평양), 1947 / Noma Cheolli (The Slow Horse Goes Four Hundred Kilometers), Yangseogak (Pyeongyang), 1947

《노마만리》, 이상경 편집, 동광출판사, 1989 / Noma Malli (The Slow Horse Goes Four Thousand Kilometers), edited by Lee Sang-gyeong, Donggwang, 1989

《태백산맥》, 김학동 옮김, 노트북, 2006 / Taebaek sanmaek (The Taebaek Mountains), translated by Kim Hakdong, Noteubuk, 2006

《낙조》, 큰글, 2010 / Nakjo (Falling), Keungeul, 2010

== Translations ==
《빛 속에》, 크리스토퍼 스캇 영역, 아시아, 2015 / Into the Light: Volume 95, translated by Christopher D. Scott, Asia Publishers, 2015

同志們, 看見海了!, 文藝翻譯出版社(Beijing), 1951 (Translation of Badaga boinda)

隊伍向着太陽, 靑年出版社, 1952 (Translation of Daeoneun taeyangeul hyanghayeo)

== Awards ==
Nominated for the 1940 Akutagawa Prize for "Into the Light."

== See also ==
- Monument Erected in China to Commemorate Writers Kim Hakchul and Kim Sa-ryang, Who Fought Against Japan.
- 100 Actors Reading Korean Literature: Pak Geonhyeong Reading Into the Light by Kim Sa-ryang.
