= USS Pegasus =

USS Pegasus is the name of two ships of the United States Navy:

- USS Pegasus (AK-48) was a cargo ship in naval service 1941–46.
- USS Pegasus (PHM-1) was the lead Pegasus-class hydrofoils, operated by the U.S. Navy 1974–1993.

== See also ==
- Pegasus-class hydrofoil, a series of U.S. Navy patrol boats
- HMS Pegasus, the name of several British Royal Navy ships
- Pegasus (disambiguation)
