= Pegasus 1 =

American satellite

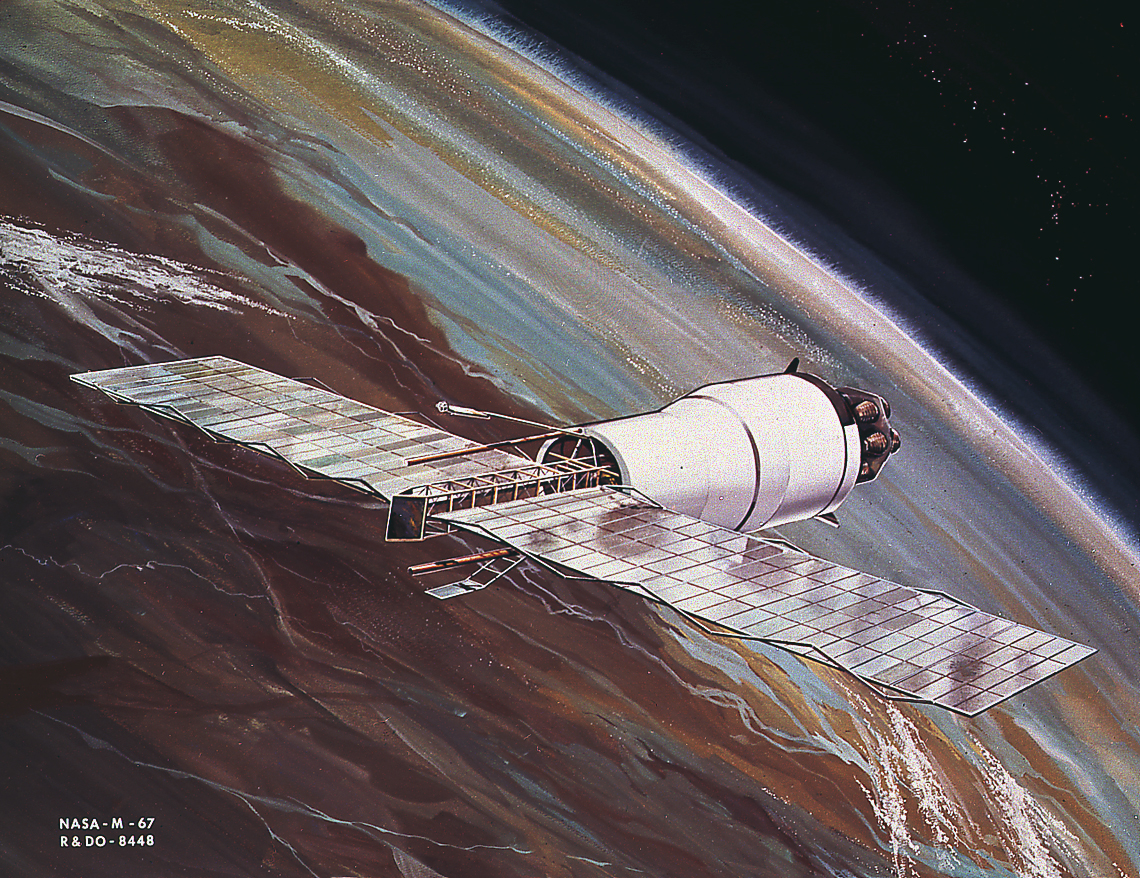
- A Pegasus satellite in orbit
- Mission type: Micrometeoroid detection
- Operator: NASA
- COSPAR ID: 1965-009A
- SATCAT no.: 001085
- Mission duration: 3 years 6 months 13 days

Spacecraft properties
- Spacecraft type: Pegasus
- Manufacturer: Fairchild Hiller
- Launch mass: 10,297 kilograms (22,701 lb)
- Payload mass: 1,450 kilograms (3,200 lb)

Start of mission
- Launch date: 16 February 1965
- Rocket: Saturn I SA-9
- Launch site: Cape Canaveral LC-37B

End of mission
- Disposal: Decommissioned
- Deactivated: 29 August 1968
- Decay date: 17 September 1978

Orbital parameters
- Reference system: Geocentric
- Regime: Low Earth orbit
- Perigee altitude: 500 kilometers (270 nmi)
- Apogee altitude: 731 kilometers (395 nmi)
- Inclination: 31.7 degrees
- Period: 97.00 minutes
- Epoch: 18 March 1965

Pegasus 1 or I, known before launch as Pegasus A, was an American satellite which was launched in 1965 to study micrometeoroid impacts in low Earth orbit. It was the first of three Pegasus satellites to be launched. The Pegasus spacecraft were manufactured by Fairchild Hiller, and operated by NASA.

== Spacecraft ==
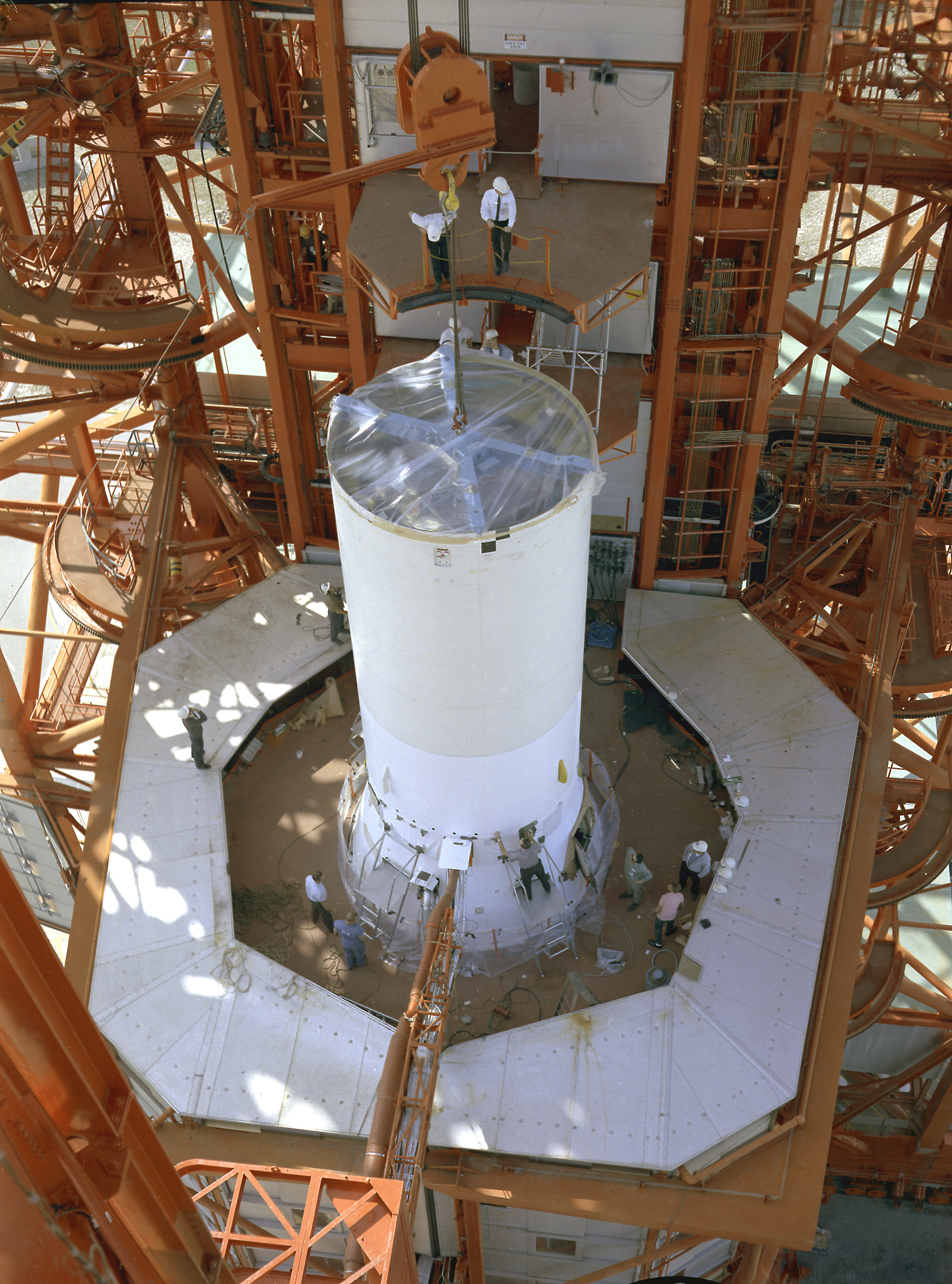
Pegasus-1, meteoroid detection satellite, installed on Saturn I (SA-9 mission) S-IV stage, January 13, 1965.

Pegasus 1 was a Pegasus satellite, consisting of 1,450 kilograms (3,200 lb) of instruments, attached to the S-IV upper stage of the carrier rocket which had placed it into orbit. It had a total mass of 10,297 kilograms (22,701 lb), and was equipped with two sets of micrometeoroid detection panels, and a radio for tracking and returning data. The panels were 29 meters (95 ft) long, and equipped with 116 individual detectors.

== Launch ==
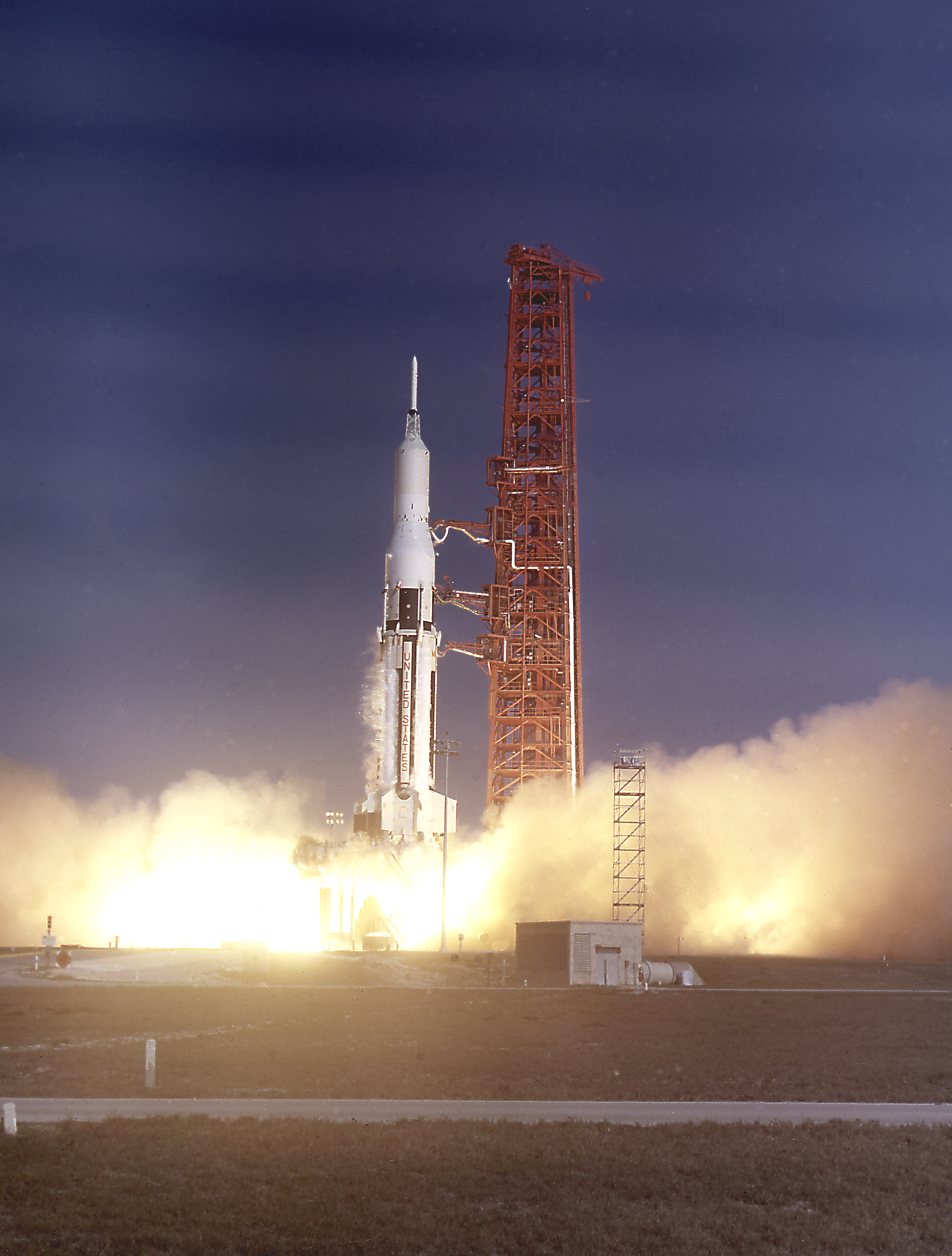
The launch of Pegasus 1

Pegasus 1 was launched atop a Saturn I rocket, serial number SA-9, flying from Launch Complex 37B at the Cape Kennedy Air Force Station. The launch occurred at 14:37:03 UTC on 16 February 1965. Following launch, Pegasus 1 was given the COSPAR designation 1965-009A, while NORAD assigned it the Satellite Catalog Number 01085.

Pegasus 1 was a secondary payload of Apollo program mission AS-103, which also carried a boilerplate Apollo spacecraft BP-16. The Apollo boilerplate acted as a payload fairing for the Pegasus spacecraft, which was stored inside what would have been the Service Module of a functional spacecraft. Upon reaching orbit, the boilerplate Command and Service modules were jettisoned.

The trajectory and space-fixed velocity were very nearly as planned. The Apollo shroud separated from the Pegasus satellite about 804 seconds after lift-off and deployment of two meteoroid detection panel wings of the Pegasus satellite commenced about 1 minute later.

== Operations ==
Pegasus 1 was operated in a low Earth orbit. On 18 March 1965 it was catalogued as being in an orbit with a perigee of 500 kilometers (270 nmi) and an apogee of 731 kilometers (395 nmi), inclined at 31.7 degrees to the Equator and with a period of 97.00 minutes. Once in orbit, the panels were deployed to detect micrometeoroid impacts. Experiment results were returned to Earth by radio. The spacecraft operated until 29 August 1968, and subsequently remained in orbit until it decayed and reentered the atmosphere on 17 September 1978. Although minor malfunctions occurred in both the launch vehicle and the satellite, the mission was a success in that all objectives were met.

== See also ==
- 1965 in spaceflight
