= Restoran Moon =

Restaurant in Tallinn, Estonia

- Restoran Moon in the Telliskivi TLN quarter, November 2025
- Interactive map of Restoran Moon

Restaurant information
- Established: December 2009
- Food type: Slavic-inspired cuisine
- Location: Telliskivi 60/4, Tallinn, Estonia
- Website: restoranmoon.ee

Restoran Moon (originally Kohvik Moon) is a restaurant serving Slavic-inspired cuisine in the Telliskivi TLN quarter of Kalamaja, Tallinn, Estonia. The restaurant opened in December 2009 on Võrgu Street and relocated in the summer of 2025 to a former railway blacksmith's workshop at Telliskivi 60/4. Since the Michelin Guide introduced its first Estonian selection in 2022, Moon has been included among its recommended restaurants every year through 2026. The name Moon means "poppy" in Estonian.

== History ==
=== Founding ===
The restaurant was founded by Roman Zaštšerinski, Igor Andrejev and Jana Zaštšerinski. Before Moon opened, Roman Zaštšerinski had been head chef at Restaurant Ö, Igor Andrejev had been involved in establishing the Tchaikovsky restaurant in Tallinn, and Jana Zaštšerinski had contributed to the development of Restaurant Muuseum.

The idea behind Moon was to offer simple dishes inspired by Slavic culinary traditions. Its menu drew partly on the founders' family food traditions, with roots in Ukraine, Belarus, Russia and the Lake Peipus region of Estonia. Home-style cooking and recipes passed down through generations were central to the concept.

=== Kalamaja, 2009–2025 ===
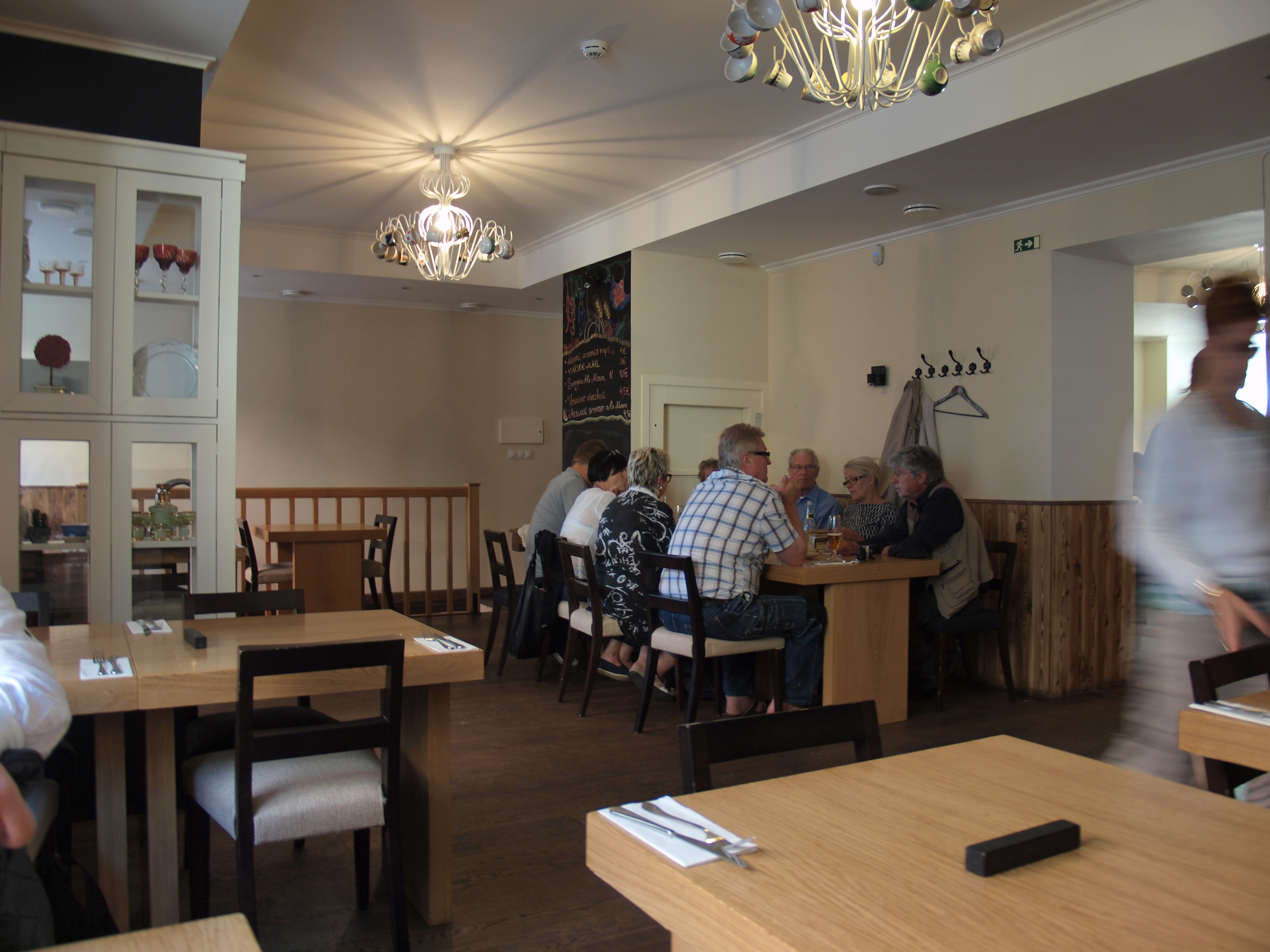
The restaurant's original dining room on Võrgu Street, August 2012

Moon opened in December 2009 on the ground floor of an office building on Võrgu Street, outside Tallinn's city centre. The restaurant quickly became popular, and during its first months Roman Zaštšerinski and Igor Andrejev worked long hours in the kitchen. In May 2010, the Finnish newspaper Helsingin Sanomat described Moon as one of Tallinn's most interesting restaurants.

In the 2010 ranking of Estonia's 50 best restaurants, in which fine-dining establishments were assessed separately, Moon was named the best place to eat in Tallinn. Postimees summarised its appeal as local, simple, tasty and affordable food. Moon placed tenth in the 2013 Eesti Maitsed ranking of Estonia's best restaurants. The White Guide Baltic classified the restaurant at its "Very Fine Level".

The same restaurateurs later opened Kolm Sibulat. They also previously owned Mantel ja Korsten, which subsequently left their ownership.

The original premises on Võrgu Street were relatively small, and high demand often made advance reservations necessary.

=== Telliskivi, since 2025 ===
In the summer of 2025, Moon relocated to the Telliskivi district, occupying a former railway blacksmith's workshop at Telliskivi 60/4. The move provided more spacious premises and greater opportunities to host larger events.

In its 2026 Nordic restaurant guide, Falstaff described Moon as a restaurant that had reinvented itself in its new location, retaining familiar dishes while presenting them in a more contemporary style. That year, the restaurant received a Michelin Guide recommendation for the fifth consecutive year, its first following the relocation.

== Premises ==
The dining room of Restoran Moon in Telliskivi, 2025

The restaurant occupies the G-building in the Telliskivi TLN quarter, a former railway blacksmith's workshop. The wider Telliskivi area contains former industrial buildings that have been redeveloped for cultural and commercial use.

The spacious, high-ceilinged dining room features an open kitchen and limestone walls. Historical elements of the building have been preserved, and one of the light fixtures is decorated with old coffee cups.

The restaurant occupies two floors. The upper floor can be reserved for private events, while the layout of the premises can be adapted for different types of gatherings.

== Cuisine and drinks ==
A selection of dishes served at Restoran Moon

Moon's menu draws on Slavic culinary traditions, local ingredients and seasonal produce. According to the restaurant, its culinary philosophy emphasises simplicity, honesty, local ingredients and respect for food. The Michelin Guide characterises its approach as simple, honest, local and sustainable.

Among the restaurant's longstanding dishes are borscht, Siberian pelmeni, chicken Kiev and buckwheat blini. According to the White Guide, borscht has been on the menu since the restaurant opened. Other dishes served over the years have included marinated mushrooms, pickles with honey, fish soup, veal liver steak with onion jam and carp in sour cream.

Alongside its established dishes, the menu includes seasonal offerings and plant-based options.

The drinks list includes wines from established European wine regions and smaller producers, beverages from Estonian producers and non-alcoholic options.

== Events ==
In addition to its regular restaurant service, Moon organises special dinners in collaboration with guest chefs and wine producers, as well as seasonal events. It has also hosted dinners outside Tallinn, including events on Muhu and in Setomaa during the summer of 2026.

The restaurant has also participated in Tallinn Restaurant Week.

== Recognition ==
- 2010 – Best place to eat in Tallinn in the ranking of Estonia's 50 best restaurants
- 2013 – 10th place in the Eesti Maitsed ranking of Estonia's best restaurants
- White Guide Baltic – "Very Fine Level"
- 2022–2026 – Recommended by the Michelin Guide Estonia for five consecutive years
- 2026 – Falstaff Restaurant & Bistro Guide Nordics, 86 out of 100 points
