= Tenma (disambiguation) =

Tenma a Japanese X-ray astronomy satellite launched in 1983.

Tenma may also refer to:

- Tenma goddesses, twelve guardian deities in Tibetan Buddhism
- Tianma or "heavenly horse" (Japanese reading Tenma), a creature similar to Pegasus in Eastern mythology
- Mara (demon) (also known as Tenma in Japanese), a malignant celestial king who tempted Gautama Buddha
- TENMA, a house brand of Premier Farnell, used for bench power supplies and electronic measuring equipment

== People with the first name ==
- Tenma Sano (佐野 天馬, born 1997), Japanese kickboxer
- Tenma Shibuya (渋谷 天馬, born 1969), Japanese actor

== People with the surname ==
- Hitoshi Tenma (天間 一, born 1942), Japanese boxer

== People with the nickname ==
- Tenma (musician), Indian musician

== Fictional characters ==
- Dr. Tenma, the father/creator of Astro Boy in the Astro Boy anime and manga series
- Dr. Kenzo Tenma, a Japanese neurosurgeon character in Monster
- Gabriel White Tenma from Gabriel DropOut
- Pegasus Tenma, one of the protagonists in the manga and anime Saint Seiya: The Lost Canvas and Saint Seiya: Next Dimension
- Tenma Momoe, one of the main characters from Tokyo Ravens
- Tenma Tsukamoto, the female protagonist in School Rumble
- The Tenma from A Dark Rabbit Has Seven Lives
- Tenma Tsukasa and Tenma Saki, two characters from Hatsune Miku: Colorful Stage!
- Tenma Udai from Haikyu!!
