= HMS Pegasus =

HMS Pegasus is a Royal Navy Reserve unit that supports the Fleet Air Arm in times of stretch, crisis, tension and war. It is administered from RNAS Yeovilton (HMS Heron), there is also a satellite office at RNAS Culdrose (HMS Seahawk). Previously the name has been given to nine ships in the British Royal Navy including:

- HMS Pegasus (1776), a ship sloop, was launched in 1776 but foundered a year later.
- HMS Pegasus (1779), a 28-gun sixth-rate frigate launched in 1779 and sold in 1816. At one stage her captain was Prince William Henry, later William IV of the United Kingdom.
- HMS Pegase (1782), a 74-gun third-rate ship of the line, captured from the French in 1782.
- HMS Pegasus was a Cormorant-class wooden-hulled screw gun vessel ordered in 1861 but cancelled in 1863.
- HMS Pegasus (1878), a 1,140-ton Doterel-class sloop launched in 1878.
- HMS Pegasus (1897), a 2,135-ton Pelorus-class cruiser launched in 1897.
- HMS Pegasus (1917), a 3,300-ton seaplane tender, launched on 9 June 1917.
- HMS Pegasus (1934), the world's first purpose-built seaplane carrier, commissioned as HMS Ark Royal, but renamed Pegasus in 1934.

== See also ==
- USS Pegasus, name of two ships of the United States Navy
- Pegasus (disambiguation)
