= Cheonmasan =

Mountain in Gyeonggi Province, South Korea

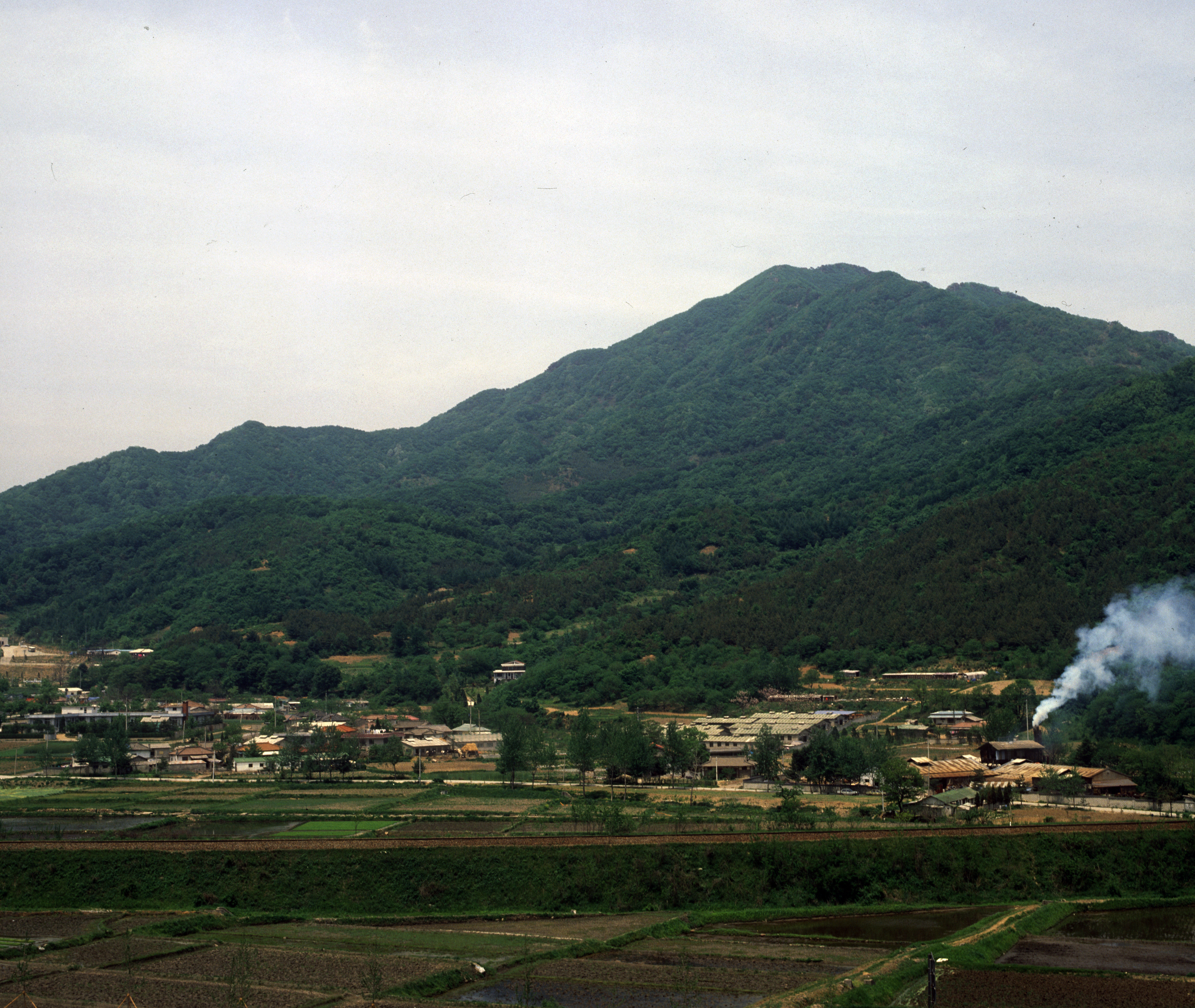

Highest point
- Elevation: 810.2 m (2,658 ft)
- Listing: Mountains of Korea
- Coordinates: 37°40′50″N 127°16′22″E

Geography
- Country: South Korea
- Province: Gyeonggi

Korean name
- Hangul: 천마산
- Hanja: 天摩山
- RR: Cheonmasan
- MR: Ch'ŏnmasan

Cheonmasan (Korean: 천마산) is a mountain in Gyeonggi Province, South Korea. It can be found within the boundaries of Namyangju. Cheonmasan has an elevation of 810.2 m (2,658 ft).

== Etymology ==
Taejo of Joseon reportedly remarked about the mountain: "This mountain is so high, if its hand was just a stone taller it could touch the sky". Hence its name became "Cheonmasan", meaning "mountain that can touch the sky".
