= Pegasus (satellite) =

Three American satellites launched in 1965

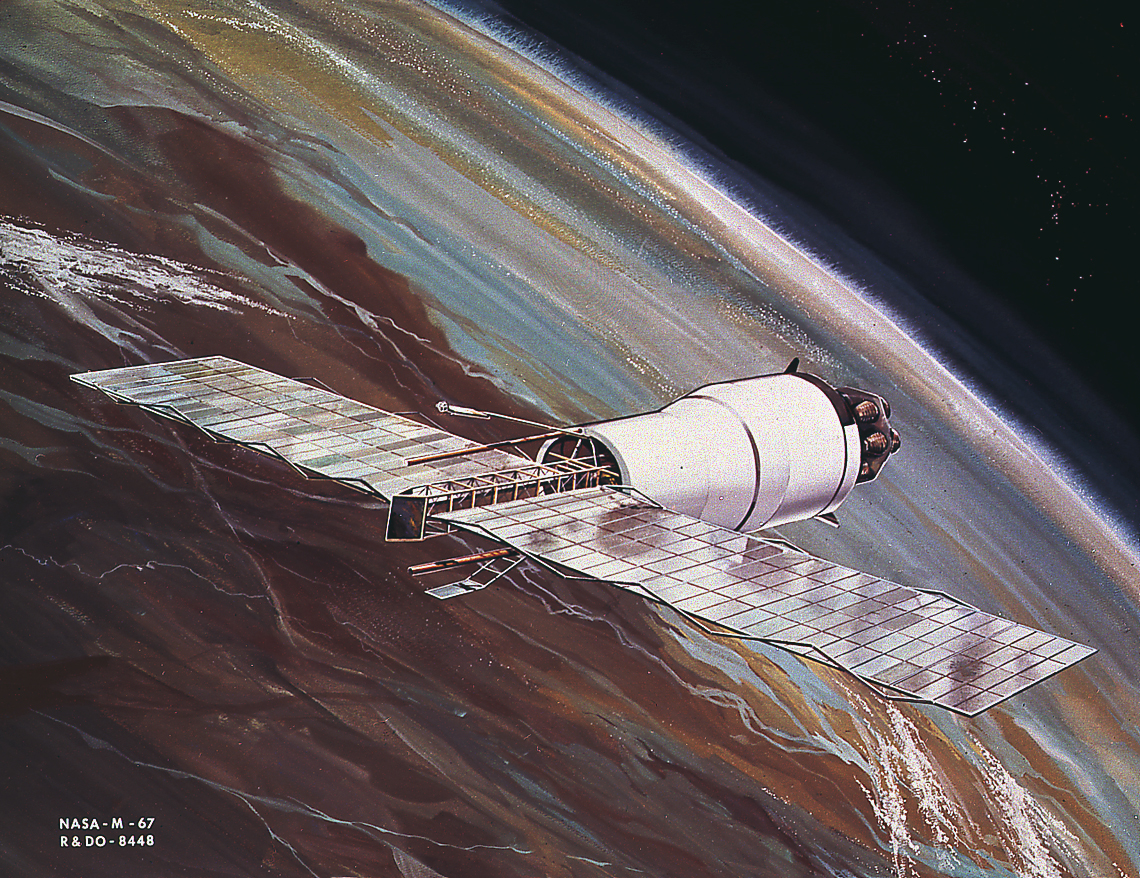
- Pegasus satellite, attached to the S-IV upper stage
- Manufacturer: Fairchild Hiller
- Country of origin: United States
- Operator: NASA
- Applications: Micrometeoroid detection

Specifications
- Launch mass: 1,450 kilograms (3,200 lb)
- Dimensions: 29 meters (96 ft) wide by 4.1 meters (13.6 ft) long
- Power: Solar cells
- Regime: Low Earth orbit

Production
- Status: retired
- Built: 3
- Launched: 3
- Operational: February 16, 1965
- Retired: August 29, 1968
- Failed: 0
- Maiden launch: February 16, 1965
- Last launch: July 30, 1965

Configuration
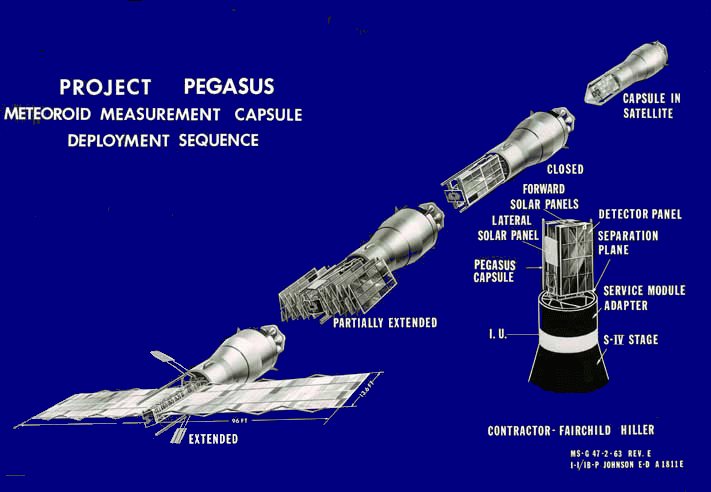
- Deployment of a Pegasus Satellite

The Pegasus Project was a NASA initiative to study the frequency of micrometeoroid impacts on spacecraft by means of a constellation of three satellites launched in 1965. All three Pegasus satellites were launched by Saturn I rockets, and remained connected with their upper stages.

The Pegasus satellites were named for the winged horse of Greek mythology and was first lofted into space by a NASA Saturn I rocket on February 16, 1965. Like its namesake, the Pegasus satellite was notable for its "wings", a pair of 96-foot-long (29 m), 14-foot-wide (4.3 m) arrays of 104 panels fitted with sensors to detect punctures by micrometeoroids at high altitudes, in support of the Apollo Program to send crewed lunar landing missions starting by 1970. Micrometeoroids were believed to be potentially hazardous to the Apollo crew if they could puncture the spacecraft skin. The sensors successfully measured the frequency, size, direction and penetration of scores of micrometeoroid impacts. The satellite also carried sample protective shields mounted on the arrays.

The NASA Marshall Space Flight Center was responsible for the design, production and operation of the three Pegasus satellites which were launched by Saturn I rocket test flights in 1965. At launch, a boilerplate Apollo Command/Service Module and launch escape system tower were atop the Saturn I, with the Pegasus experiment folded inside the Service Module. After first stage separation and second-stage ignition, the launch escape system was jettisoned. When the second stage attained orbit, the 10,000-pound Apollo boilerplate Command and Service modules were jettisoned into a separate orbit. Then a motor driven device extended the winglike panels on the Pegasus to a span of 96 feet (29 m). The Pegasus wings remained attached to the Saturn I's second stage as planned.

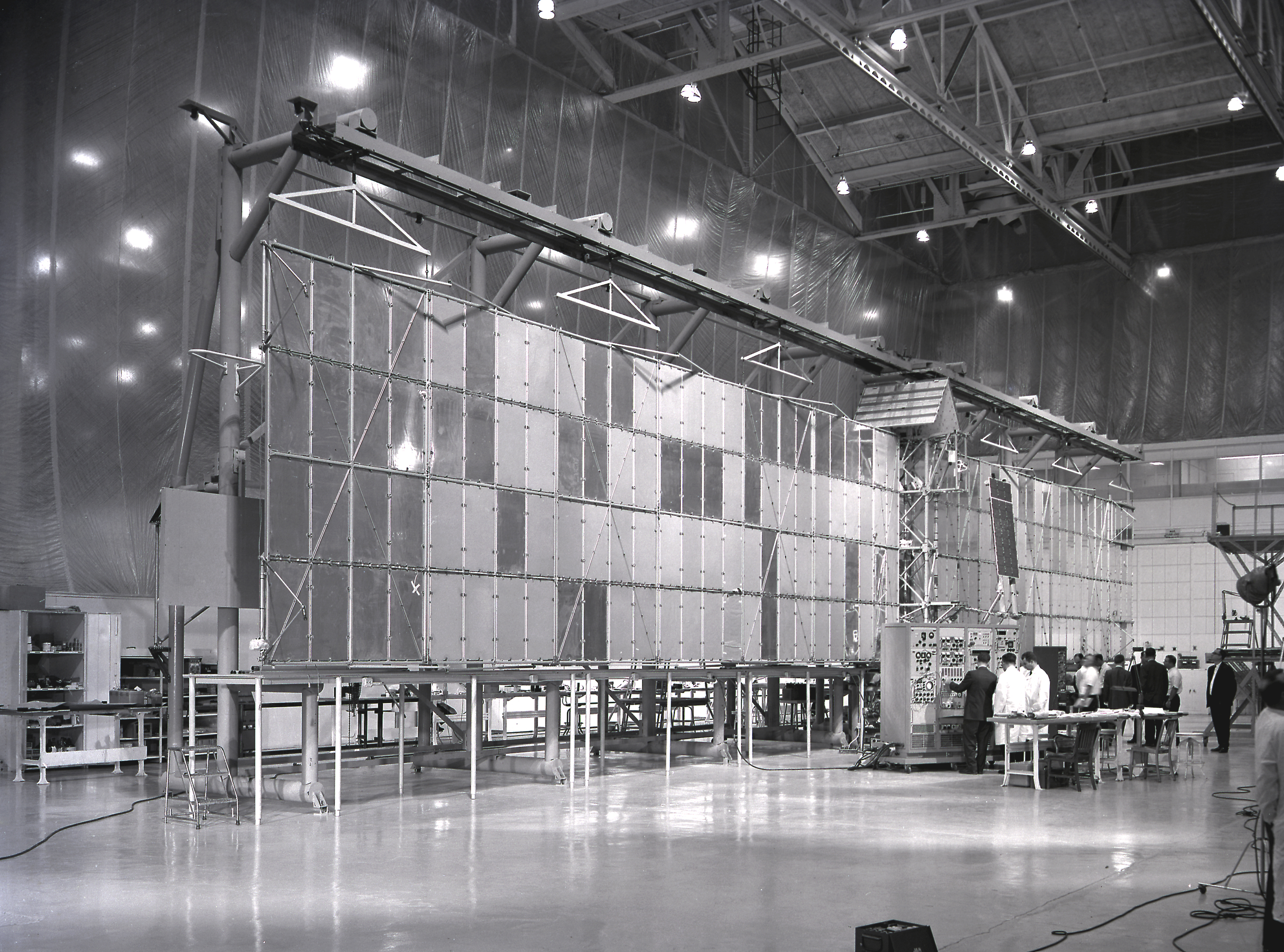
Detector arrays of a Pegasus satellite

A television camera, mounted on the interior of the Service Module adapter, provided pictures of the satellite deploying in space and as historian Roger E. Bilstein has written, "captured a vision of the eerie silent wings of Pegasus I as they haltingly deployed." The satellite exposed more than 2,300 square feet (210 m^{2}) of instrumented surface, with thickness varying up to 0.016-inch (0.41 mm).

Ernst Stuhlinger, then director of the MSFC Research Projects Laboratory, noted that all three Pegasus missions provided more than data on micrometeoroid penetration. Scientists also were able to gather data regarding gyroscopic motion and orbital characteristics of rigid bodies in space, lifetimes of electronic components in the space environment, and thermal control systems and the degrading effects of space on thermal control coatings. Space historian Roger Bilstein reported that for physicists the Pegasus missions provided additional knowledge about the radiation environments of space, the Van Allen radiation belts and other phenomena.

== Orbits ==
- Pegasus 1
  - Launched: February 16, 1965
  - Launch vehicle: A-103
  - Orbital inclination: 31.7 degrees.
  - Perigee: 510 km
  - Apogee: 726 km
  - Launch weight: 10.5 tons.
  - Dry weight: 1451.5 kg
  - Decayed: September 17, 1978
  - International Designator: 1965-009A
- Pegasus 2
  - Launched: May 25, 1965
  - Launch vehicle: A-104
  - Orbital inclination: 31.7 degrees.
  - Perigee: 502 km
  - Apogee: 740 km
  - Launch weight: 10.46 tons.
  - Dry weight: 1451.5 kg
  - Decayed: November 3, 1979
  - International Designator: 1965-039A
- Pegasus 3
  - Launched: July 30, 1965
  - Launch vehicle: A-105
  - Orbital inclination: 28.9 degrees.
  - Perigee: 441 km
  - Apogee: 449 km
  - Launch weight: 10.5 tons.
  - Dry weight: 1451.5 kg
  - Decayed: August 4, 1969
  - International Designator: 1965-060A
