= Pigasus =

Pigasus, a portmanteau of pig and Pegasus, may refer to:

- Pigasus, a character created by Ruth Plumly Thompson in her continuations of the Oz series of books
- Pigasus, a personal symbol used by John Steinbeck
- Pigasus (politics), the Youth International Party ("Yippie") candidate for the U.S. presidency in 1968
- Pigasus Award, an award given out by James Randi which recognizes paranormal frauds
- Pigasus Records, Hailey Whitters's music label
