= Tianma Tea House =

Former tea house in Taipei, Taiwan

- 天馬茶房
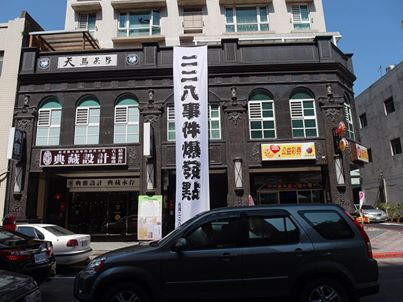
- Interactive map of the Tianma Tea House area

General information
- Type: former tea house
- Location: Datong, Taipei, Taiwan
- Coordinates: 25°03′14.5″N 121°30′43.5″E
- Completed: 1934
- Demolished: 2005

Tianma Tea House
- Traditional Chinese: 天馬茶房
- Simplified Chinese: 天马茶房
- Hokkien POJ: Thian-má Tê Pâng
- Literal meaning: Sky-horse Tea House
Transcriptions
Standard Mandarin
- Hanyu Pinyin: Tiānmǎ Chá Fáng
Southern Min
- Hokkien POJ: Thian-má Tê Pâng

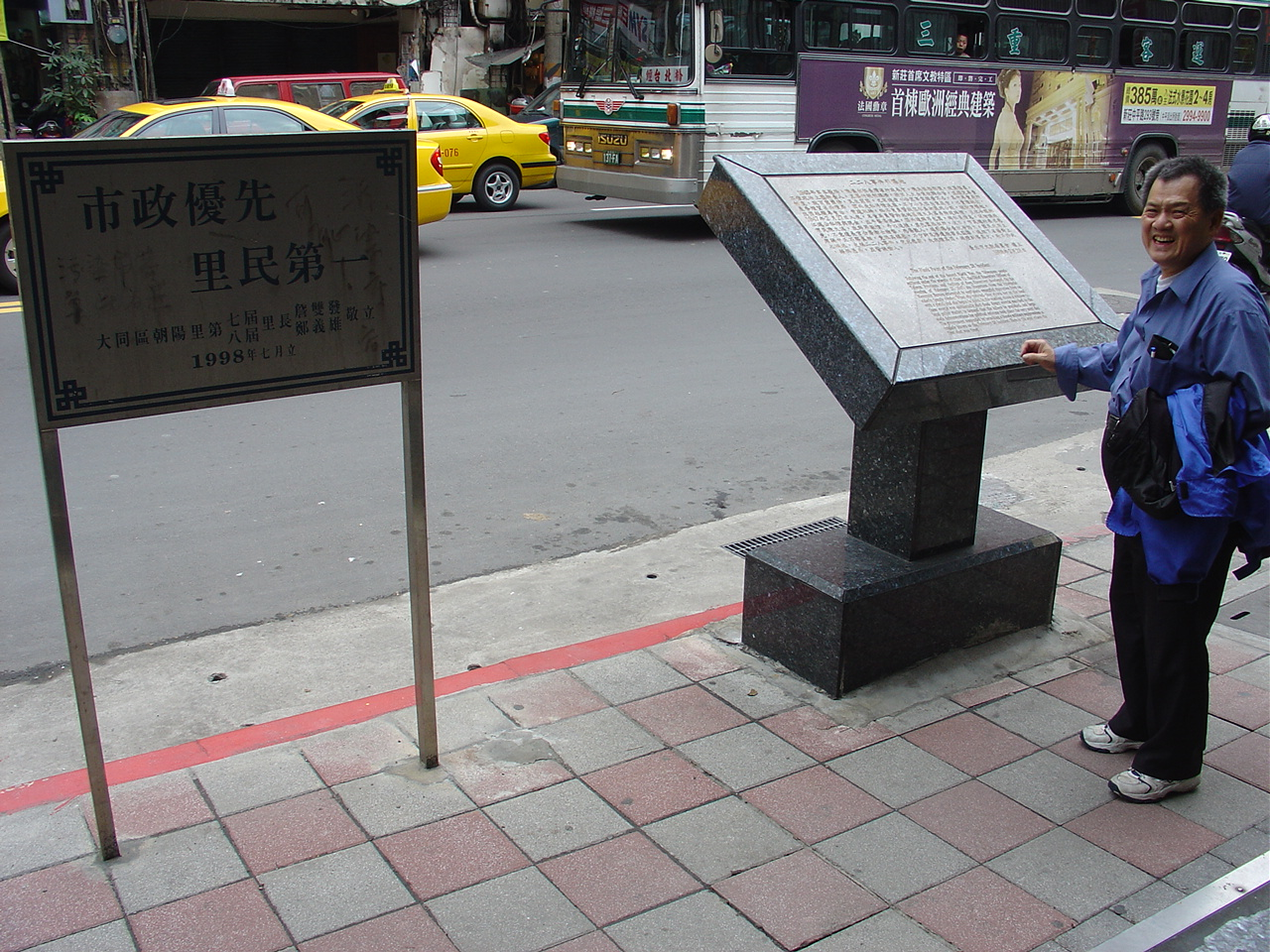
A memorial plaque near Tianma Tea House marking the spot of the shooting which eventually led to the February 28 Incident.

The Tianma Tea House is a former tea house in Datong District, Taipei, Taiwan. It is the site where an enforcement officer from the Taiwan Tobacco and Wine Monopoly Bureau of the Taiwan Provincial Government accidentally shot a civilian on 27 February 1947. The incident led to the island-wide anti-government uprising by the Taiwanese people called the February 28 incident and the implementation of White Terror in Taiwan from 1949 to 1987.

The tea house building has long been on the route of the annual march to commemorate the February 28 Incident in Taipei by government officials or civilians.

== History ==
The tea house was originally opened by a famous orator and lyricist Zhan Tianma shortly after 1934. It was closed down after the February 28 incident in 1947.

== Transportation ==
The building is accessible within walking distance west from Zhongshan Station of Taipei Metro.

== See also ==
- February 28 Incident
- List of tourist attractions in Taiwan
