= S-IV =

Second stage for NASA's Saturn I rocket

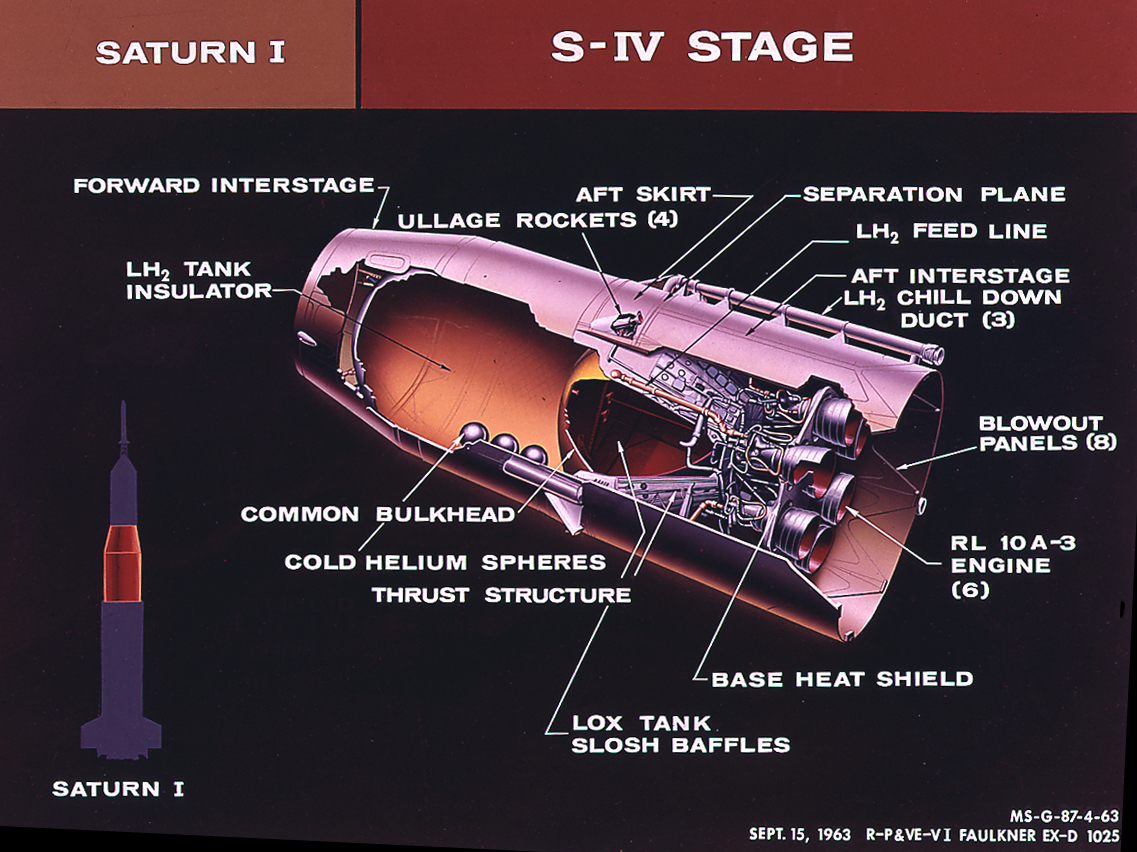
- Schematics of the S-IV
- Manufacturer: Douglas Aircraft Company
- Country of origin: United States
- Used on: Saturn I (stage 2)

General characteristics
- Height: 12.19 m (40 ft)
- Diameter: 5.49 m (18 ft)
- Gross mass: 50,576 kg (111,501 lb)
- Propellant mass: 45,359 kg (99,999 lb)
- Empty mass: 5,217 kg (11,502 lb)

Associated stages
- Derivatives: S-IVB

Launch history
- Status: Retired
- Total launches: 6
- Successes (stage only): 6
- First flight: January 29, 1964
- Last flight: July 30, 1965

S-IV 100 series
- Powered by: 6 × RL10
- Maximum thrust: 400 kN (90,000 lbf)
- Specific impulse: 410 s (4.0 km/s)
- Burn time: 482 s
- Propellant: LH_{2} / LOX

The S-IV was the second stage of the Saturn I rocket used by NASA for early flights in the Apollo program.

The S-IV was manufactured by the Douglas Aircraft Company and later modified by them to the S-IVB, a similar but distinct stage used on the Saturn IB and Saturn V rockets.

The S-IV stage was a large LOX/LH_{2}-fueled rocket stage used for the early test flights of the Saturn I rocket. It formed the second stage of the Saturn I and was powered by a cluster of six RL10A-3 engines. Each one of the engines supplied 66.7 kilonewtons (15,000 lb_{f}) of thrust for a total of about 400 kilonewtons (90,000 lb_{f}). The cryogenic LH_{2} (liquid hydrogen) and LOX (liquid oxygen) tanks were separated by a common bulkhead. The forward bulkhead of the LOX tank formed the aft bulkhead of the LH_{2} tank. This saved up to 20% of structural weight.

== Flight history ==
Mission serial number	Launch date (UTC)	Image	Launch notes
SA-1	October 27, 1961; 15:06:04		First test flight; Block I; Suborbital; Range: 398 km (247 mi); Apogee: 1,365 km (848 mi); Apogee Mass: 52,500 kg (115,700 lb); Dummy S-IV and S-V stages
SA-2	April 25, 1962; 14:00:34		Second test flight; Block I; Suborbital; 86,000 kg (190,000 lb) of water released at apogee of 145 km (90 mi) as part of first Project Highwater flight
SA-3	November 16, 1962; 17:45:02		Third test flight; Block I; Suborbital; Dummy S-IV and S-V stages; 86,000 kg (190,000 lb) of water released at apogee of 167 km (104 mi) as part of second and last Project Highwater flight
SA-4	March 28, 1963; 20:11:55		Fourth test flight; Block I; Suborbital; Dummy S-IV second stage and S-V third stage; Apogee: 129 km (80 mi); Range: 400 km (250 mi)
SA-5	January 29, 1964; 16:25:01		First live S-IV second stage; First Block II; First to orbit: 760 km × 264 km (472 mi × 164 mi); Mass: 17,550 kg (38,690 lb); Decayed 30 April 1966
SA-6	May 28, 1964; 17:07:00		First Apollo boilerplate CSM launch; Block II; Orbit: 204 km × 179 km (127 mi × 111 mi); Mass: 17,650 kg (38,910 lb); Apollo BP-13 decayed 1 June 1964
SA-7	September 18, 1964; 16:22:43		Second Apollo boilerplate CSM launch; Block II; Orbit: 203 km × 178 km (126 mi × 111 mi); Mass: 16,700 kg (36,800 lb)); Apollo BP-15 decayed 22 September 1964
SA-9	February 16, 1965; 14:37:03		Third Apollo boilerplate CSM; First Pegasus micrometeoroid satellite; Orbit: 523 km × 430 km (325 mi × 267 mi); Mass: 1,450 kg (3,200 lb); Pegasus 1 decayed 17 September 1978; Apollo BP-26 decayed 10 July 1985
SA-8	May 25, 1965; 07:35:01		Fourth Apollo boilerplate CSM, only night launch; Second Pegasus micrometeoroid satellite; Orbit: 594 km × 467 km (369 mi × 290 mi); Mass: 1,450 kg (3,200 lb); Pegasus 2 decayed 3 November 1979; Apollo BP-16 decayed 8 July 1989
SA-10	July 30, 1965; 13:00:00		Third Pegasus micrometeoroid satellite; Orbit: 567 km × 535 km (352 mi × 332 mi); Mass: 1,450 kg (3,200 lb); Pegasus 3 decayed 4 August 1969; Apollo BP-9A decayed 22 November 1975
