= S-V =

Third stage of Saturn I rocket

- Saturn S-V stage illustration
- Manufacturer: Convair
- Country of origin: United States
- Used on: Saturn I (stage 3)

General characteristics
- Height: 9.14 m (30.0 ft)
- Diameter: 3.05 m (10.0 ft)
- Gross mass: 15,600 kg (34,400 lb)
- Propellant mass: 13,604 kg (30,000 lb)
- Empty mass: 1,996 kg (4,400 lb)

Associated stages
- Family: Saturn
- Derivatives: Centaur

Launch history
- Status: Retired
- Total launches: 4
- Successes (stage only): 4
- Failed: 0
- First flight: October 27, 1961
- Last flight: March 28, 1963

S-V
- Powered by: 2 RL10 engines
- Maximum thrust: 133.45 kN (30,000 lbf)
- Specific impulse: 425 s (4.17 km/s)
- Burn time: 425 s
- Propellant: LH_{2} / LOX

The S-V (pronounced "S-five") was the third stage of the Saturn I rocket. It was built by Convair. It was designed to use two RL10A-1 engines fueled by liquid hydrogen (LH_{2)} and liquid oxygen (LOX) in tanks utilizing a common bulkhead to separate the propellants.

== History ==
Convair Astronautics was awarded a contract to deliver the S-V stage for the Saturn I. The stage was intended to boost lift capacity for U.S. military launches in the 1960s. The S-V would ultimately fly as the third stage on early launches of the Saturn I. Convair delivered two S-V stages in February 1961 with one being flown on SA-1 attached to an also inert S-IV, the second was used for dynamic testing of the complete Saturn I before being later flown. In May 1961 NASA eliminated the requirement for all Saturn I launches to be flown with S-V's by flying in a two-stage only version. Despite this, the stage would fly four times in total. With the introduction of the Saturn IB and the needs of the military fulfilled on other launches, all further launches would be on either the Saturn IB or Saturn V, neither of which used the S-V. A version of this stage was also used on the Atlas-LV3C as the Centaur, modern derivatives of which are still flown today, making it the only Saturn rocket stage still currently operating.

== Flight history ==
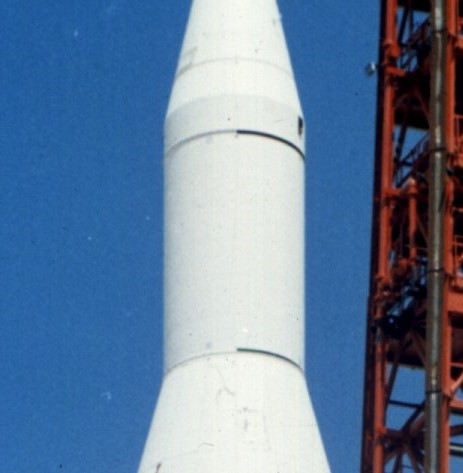
S-V stage on the Saturn I SA-4 rocket

Ultimately, the S-V would go on to fly four times between 1961 and 1964. Each of which were flown on suborbital test flights of the Saturn I. Because of the suborbital nature of these flights, each S-V was filled with water to act as ballast, making the stage inert. The water was released in space twice for Project Highwater. Modern derivatives of the stage are still in use today on the Atlas V and the Vulcan Centaur.

Flight Number	Launch date (UTC)	Notes
SA-1	October 27, 1961 15:06:04	First test suborbital flight. Apogee: 136.5 km. Inactive S-IV and S-V stages.
SA-2	April 25, 1962 14:00:34	Second suborbital test flight. 86,000 kg water released at apogee of 145 km. Inactive S-IV and S-V stages.
SA-3	November 16, 1962 17:45:02	Third suborbital test flight. 86,000 kg water released at apogee of 167 km. Inactive S-IV and S-V stages.
SA-4	March 28, 1963 20:11:55	Fourth suborbital test flight. Apogee: 129 km. Inactive S-IV and S-V stages.
