= SA5 =

SA-5 may refer to:

- SA-5 Gammon, the NATO reporting name for the Soviet S-200 missile system
- Saturn I SA-5, the first launch of the Block II Saturn I rocket, part of the Apollo Program
- Sigma SA-5, a film SLR camera by Sigma Corporation, launched in 1997
- "SA-5", a song by American singer Beck released with 1997's "Deadweight (song)"
