= SA1 =

SA1 or SA-1 can refer to:

- Nintendo SA1, a microprocessor by Nintendo for use in SNES game cartridges
- SA1 Swansea Waterfront, the marketing name given to the brownfield development area located in Swansea Docks, South Wales
- the Royal mail postcode prefix for central Swansea
- Sonic Advance, a 2001 video game for the Game Boy Advance
- Sonic Adventure, a video game for the Sega Dreamcast, abbreviated as "SA1" by fans of the series to differentiate it from its sequel, Sonic Adventure 2
- SA-1 Guild, the NATO name for the S-25 Berkut, the first operational surface-to-air guided missile, used by the Soviets
- SA-1 (Apollo), an Apollo-flight
