= Saturn I =

American rocket used by space program

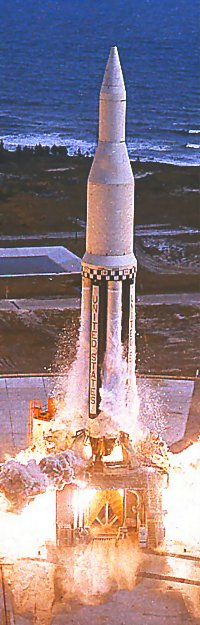
- The first Saturn I was launched October 27, 1961.
- Function: Medium-lift launch vehicle
- Manufacturer: Chrysler (S-I); Douglas (S-IV); Convair (S-V)
- Country of origin: United States

Size
- Height: 55 m (180 ft)
- Diameter: 6.60 m (21 ft 8 in)
- Mass: 510,000 kg (1,124,000 lb)
- Stages: 2 or 3 (3rd stage flew, but never in an active configuration)

Capacity

Payload to LEO
- Altitude: 185 km (115 mi)
- Orbital inclination: 28°
- Mass: 9,100 kg (20,000 lb) (2 stages)

Payload to TLI
- Mass: 2,200 kg (4,900 lb) (2 stages)

Launch history
- Status: Retired
- Launch sites: Cape Canaveral, LC-34 and LC-37
- Total launches: 10
- Success(es): 10
- First flight: 27 October 1961 (SA-1)
- Last flight: 30 July 1965 (AS-105)
- Carries passengers or cargo: Boilerplate Apollo CM, Pegasus

First stage – S-I
- Powered by: 8 × H-1
- Maximum thrust: 6,700 kN (1,500,000 lb_{f})
- Burn time: ~150 seconds
- Propellant: LOX / RP-1

Second stage – S-IV
- Powered by: 6 × RL10
- Maximum thrust: 400 kN (90,000 lb_{f})
- Specific impulse: 421 s (4.13 km/s) vacuum
- Burn time: ~482 seconds
- Propellant: LOX / LH_{2}

Third stage – S-V (flew inactively)
- Powered by: 2 × RL10
- Maximum thrust: 133 kN (30,000 lb_{f})
- Burn time: ~430 seconds
- Propellant: LOX / LH_{2}

The Saturn I (Note: Pronounced "Saturn One") was a rocket designed as the United States' first medium lift launch vehicle for up to 20,000-pound (9,100 kg) low Earth orbit payloads. Its development was taken over from the Advanced Research Projects Agency (ARPA) in 1958 by the newly formed civilian NASA. Its design proved sound and flexible. It was successful in initiating the development of liquid hydrogen-fueled rocket propulsion, launching the Pegasus satellites, and flight verification of the Apollo command and service module launch phase aerodynamics.

Ten Saturn I rockets were flown before it was replaced by the heavy lift derivative Saturn IB, which used a larger, higher total impulse second stage and an improved guidance and control system. It also led the way to development of the super-heavy lift Saturn V which carried the first men to landings on the Moon in the Apollo program.

President John F. Kennedy identified the Saturn I, and the SA-5 launch in particular, as being the point where US lift capability would surpass the Soviets, after being behind since Sputnik.

== History ==
=== Origins ===
The Saturn project was started as one of a number of proposals to meet a new Department of Defense (DoD) requirement for a heavy-lift vehicle to orbit a new class of communications and "other" satellites. The requirements called for a vehicle capable of putting 20,000 to 40,000 pounds (9,100 to 18,100 kg) into orbit, or accelerating 13,200 to 26,200 pounds (6,000 to 11,900 kg) to trans-lunar injection. Existing U.S. launchers could place a maximum of about 3,900 pounds (1,800 kg) in orbit, but might be expanded to as much as 9,900 pounds (4,500 kg) with new high-energy upper stages. In any event, these upper stages would not be available until 1961 at the earliest, and would still not meet the DoD requirements for heavy loads.

Wernher von Braun's team at the U.S. Army Ballistic Missile Agency (ABMA) started studying the problem in April 1957. They calculated that a rocket with the required performance would require a lower-stage booster with a thrust of about 1.5 million pound-force (6.7 MN) thrust at takeoff. As it happened, the Air Force had recently started work on just such an engine, eventually emerging as the F-1. But the F-1 would not be available in the time frame that the DoD was demanding and would be limited to about 1 million lbf in the short term anyway. Another possibility was a Rocketdyne engine, then known as the E-1, which provided about 360,000 to 380,000 lbf (1,600 to 1,700 kN), four of which would reach the required thrust levels. This approach became the favorite and was paired with a first stage built from a cluster of nine tanks placed atop a thrust plate where the engines and plumbing would be attached. The design envisaged eight rocket tanks similar to the Redstone stage strapped around a central larger tank derived from a Jupiter rocket. The design and diameter similarities would enable the use of the same tooling and facilities used to produce the older tanks, speeding up the design and production phases of the new stage. Contrary to what was reported to the press at the time (and propagated commonly ever since), the tanks were not simply Redstone and Jupiter tanks, but much longer versions built anew at the same diameter. However, the perception was that the first stage was a cluster of propellant tanks engineered from older rocket designs, leading critics to jokingly refer to it as "Cluster's Last Stand", a play on the nickname for the Battle of the Little Bighorn, "Custer's Last Stand".

Von Braun returned the design to DoD in December 1957 as A National Integrated Missile and Space Vehicle Development Program, outlining the new design, then known simply as "Super-Jupiter". Several variations were proposed, using a common clustered first stage, and upper stages based on either the Atlas or Titan I. ABMA favored the Titan as the Atlas production was extremely high-priority and there was little or no excess capacity to spare. They proposed using the existing Titan tooling at 120-inch (3.0 m) diameter, but lengthening it to produce a new 200-foot (61 m)-long stage. A Centaur would be used as a third stage, which was expected to be ready for operational use in 1963, right when the lower two stages would have completed their testing. The resulting three-stage design was much taller and skinnier than the Saturn design that was eventually built.

Advanced Research Projects Agency (ARPA) was formed in February 1958 as part of DoD and was in charge of the requirements. ARPA asked for only one change to the design; concerned that the E-1 was still in early development, they suggested looking at alternatives in order to ensure the rocket would enter production as soon as possible. ABMA quickly responded with a slightly modified design replacing the four E-1's with eight H-1 engines, a minor upgrade to the S-3D engine used on Thor and Jupiter missiles. They estimated that changing the engines would save about $60 million and as much as two years of research and development time.

von Braun had earlier referred to Redstone and Jupiter rockets being used as space launchers as the Juno I and Juno II, respectively, and had submitted proposals for multi-stage versions as the Juno III and IV. He changed the name of the new design to Juno V. The total development cost of $850 million ($5.6 billion in year-2007 dollars) between 1958 and 1963 also covered 30 research and development flights, some carrying crewed and uncrewed space payloads.

=== Work begins ===
Satisfied with the outcome, ARPA Order Number 14-59, dated 15 August 1958, ordered the program into existence:

Initiate a development program to provide a large space vehicle booster of approximately 1,500,000-lb. thrust based on a cluster of available rocket engines. The immediate goal of this program is to demonstrate a full-scale captive dynamic firing by the end of CY 1959.

This was followed on 11 September 1958 with another contract with Rocketdyne to start work on the H-1. On 23 September 1958, ARPA and the Army Ordnance Missile Command (AOMC) drew up an additional agreement enlarging the scope of the program, stating "In addition to the captive dynamic firing..., it is hereby agreed that this program should now be extended to provide for a propulsion flight test of this booster by approximately September 1960". Further, they wanted ABMA to produce three additional boosters, the last two of which would be "capable of placing limited payloads in orbit".

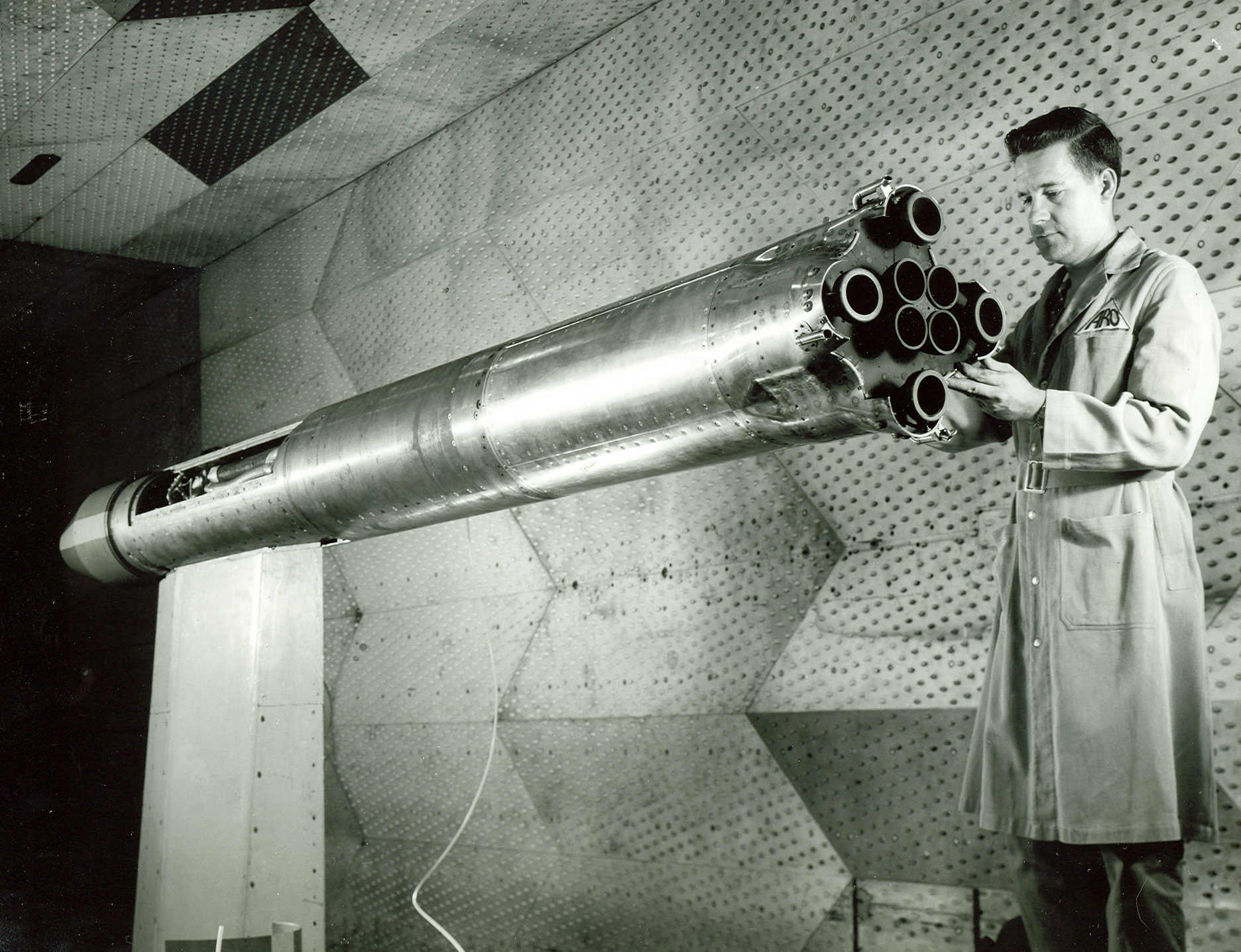
A 1/20th-scale model of first-stage Saturn is prepared for testing in the 16-foot transonic wind tunnel at Arnold Air Force Base in the early 1960s

von Braun had high hopes for the design, feeling it would make an excellent test-bed for other propulsion systems, notably the F-1 if it matured. He outlined uses for the Juno V as a general carrier vehicle for research and development of "offensive and defensive space weapons". Specific uses were forecast for each of the military services, including navigation satellites for the Navy; reconnaissance, communications, and meteorological satellites for the Army and Air Force; support for Air Force crewed missions; and surface-to-surface logistics supply for the Army at distances up to 6400 kilometers. von Braun also proposed using the Juno V as the basis of a crewed lunar mission as part of Project Horizon. Juno could lift up to 20,000 pounds (9,000 kg) into low Earth orbit, and he proposed launching 15 of them to build a 200,000 lb (91,000 kg) lunar spacecraft in Earth orbit.

Even by this point the name "Saturn", as "the one after Jupiter" was being used. One early ARPA report noted: "The SATURN is considered to be the first real space vehicle as the Douglas DC-3 was the first real airliner and durable work-horse in aeronautics". The name change became official in February 1959.

=== Transfer to NASA ===
The formation of NASA on 29 July 1958 led to an effort to collect the existing heavy-launch rocket programs and select a single set of designs for future work. At the time, both the Air Force and US Army had teams developing such vehicles, the Army's Saturn and the Air Force's Space Launching System (SLS). The SLS used a set of common modular components with solid fuel boosters and hydrogen/oxygen upper stages to allow a wide variety of launch configurations and payload weights. Both groups had also developed plans for crewed lunar bases, ABMA's Horizon with its Earth Orbit Rendezvous method of building a large lunar rocket in Earth orbit, and the Air Force's Lunex Project which planned on launching a single huge lander using the largest of the SLS configurations. As if this were not enough, NASA's own engineers had started the design of their own Nova design series, planning to use it in the direct ascent profile similar to the Air Force's approach.

Von Braun was asked to chair a committee to study the existing efforts and write up recommendations. The committee presented their report on 18 July 1958, starting with a criticism of how the US program had been mishandled to date and pointing out that the Soviet program was definitely ahead. It went on to describe five "generations" of rockets, starting with the early Vanguard, through the Juno, ICBMs like Atlas and Titan, clustered designs like the Saturn, and finally, the ultimate development, a cluster using the F-1 with 6 million pounds-force (27 MN) of thrust. The report went on to outline a crewed exploration program using these rockets as they become available; using existing ICBMs a small four-man space station could be operational 1961, the clusters would support a crewed lunar landing in 1965–1966 and a larger 50-man space station by 1967, while the largest of the rockets would support large Moon expeditions in 1972, set up a permanent Moon base in 1973–1974, and launch crewed interplanetary trips in 1977.

In December 1958, all of the teams gathered to present their designs. NASA selected von Braun's proposal on 6 January 1959, giving it a vital boost. At the end of January, NASA outlined their complete development program. This included the Vega and Centaur upper stages, as well as the Juno V and their own Nova boosters. Vega was later cancelled when information on the formerly secret Agena upper stage was released (then known as "Hustler"), and it had performance roughly comparable to NASA's design.

=== Near-cancellation ===
Progress on the Saturn design seemed to go smoothly. In April 1959, the first H-1 engines started arriving at ABMA, and test firings started in May. Construction of the Complex 34 launch sites started at Cape Canaveral in June.

Then, quite unexpectedly, on 9 June 1959, Herbert York, Director of Department of Defense Research and Engineering, announced that he had decided to terminate the Saturn program. He later stated that he was concerned that the project was taking ARPA money from more pressing projects, and that as it seemed upgrades to existing ICBMs would provide the needed heavy-lift capability in the short term. As ABMA commander John B. Medaris put it:

By this time, my nose was beginning to sniff a strange odor of "fish". I put my bird dogs to work to try to find out what was going on and with whom we had to compete. We discovered that the Air Force had proposed a wholly different and entirely new vehicle as the booster for Dynasoar, using a cluster of Titan engines and upgrading their performance to get the necessary first-stage thrust for take-off. This creature was variously christened the Super Titan, or the Titan C. No work had been done on this vehicle other than a hasty engineering outline. Yet the claim was made that the vehicle in a two-stage or three-stage configuration could be flown more quickly than the Saturn, on which we had already been working hard for many months. Dates and estimates were attached to that proposal which at best ignored many factors of costs, and at worst were strictly propaganda.

Looking to head off the cancellation, Saturn supporters from the DoD and ARPA drafted their own memo arguing against the cancellation. Working against them was that neither the Army nor NASA had any in-writing requirement for the booster at that time. A three-day meeting between 16 and 18 September 1959 followed, where York and Dryden reviewed Saturn's future and discussed the roles of the Titan C and Nova. The outcome was equally unexpected; York agreed to defer the cancellation and continue short-term funding, but only if NASA agreed to take over the ABMA team and continue development without the help of the DoD. NASA was equally concerned that by relying on third parties for their boosters they were putting their entire program in jeopardy, and were very open to the idea of taking over the team.

As the parties continued discussions over the next week an agreement was hammered out; von Braun's team at ABMA would be kept together and continue working as the lead developers of Saturn, but the entire organization would be transferred to NASA's management. By a presidential executive order on 15 March 1960, ABMA became NASA's George C. Marshall Space Flight Center (MSFC).

=== Selecting the upper stages ===
In July 1959, a change request was received from ARPA to upgrade the upper stage to a much more powerful design using four new 20,000 lbf (89 kN) liquid hydrogen / liquid oxygen powered engines in a larger-diameter 160-inch (4.1 m) second stage, with an upgraded Centaur using two engines of the same design for the third stage. On this change Medaris noted:

For reasons of economy we had recommended, and it had been approved, that in building the second stage, we would use the same diameter as the Titan first stage – 120 inches. The major costs of tooling for the fabrication of missile tanks and the main structure is related to the diameter. Changes in length cost little or nothing in tooling. How the tanks are divided internally, or the structure reinforced inside, or the kind of structural detail that is used at the end in order to attach the structure to a big booster below, or to a different size stage above, have very little effect on tooling problems. However, a change in diameter sets up a major question of tools, costs, and time.

Suddenly, out of the blue came a directive to suspend work on the second stage, and a request for a whole new series of cost and time estimates, including consideration of increasing the second stage diameter to 160 inches. It appeared that Dr. York had entered the scene, and had pointed up the future requirements of Dynasoar as being incompatible with the 120-inch diameter. He had posed the question of whether it was possible for the Saturn to be so designed as to permit it to be the booster for that Air Force project.

We were shocked and stunned. This was no new problem, and we could find no reason why it should not have been considered, if necessary, during the time that the Department of Defense and NASA were debating the whole question of what kind of upper stages we should use. Nevertheless, we very speedily went about the job of estimating the project on the basis of accepting the 160-inch diameter. At the same time, it was requested that we submit quotations for a complete operational program to boost the Dynasoar for a given number of flights. As usual, we were given two or three numbers, rather than one fixed quantity, and asked to estimate on each of them.

In order to reach some sort of accommodation, a group pulled from NASA, Air Force, ARPA, ABMA, and the Office of the Department of Defense Research and Engineering formed under the Silverstein Committee in December. von Braun was skeptical of liquid hydrogen as an upper stage fuel, but the Committee convinced him that it was the way to go on future upper stage development. Once these changes had been made, NASA's booster project was now entirely free of any dependence on military developments. At that point any sort of upper stage was fair game, and "If these propellants are to be accepted for the difficult top-stage applications", the committee concluded, "there seem to be no valid engineering reasons for not accepting the use of high-energy propellants for the less difficult application to intermediate stages".

The Committee outlined a number of different potential launch configurations, grouped into three broad categories. The "A" group were low-risk versions similar to the Saturn designs proposed prior to the meeting; the original design using Titan and Centaur upper stages became the A-1, while another model replacing the Titan with a cluster of IRBMs became A-2. The B-1 design proposed a new second stage replacing the A-2s cluster with a new four-engine design using the H-1 like the lower stage. There were three C-series models that replaced all of the upper stages with liquid hydrogen ones.

The C-1 used the existing S-I clustered lower, adding the new S-IV stage with four new 15,000 to 20,000 lbf (67 to 89 kN) engines, and keeping the two-engine Centaur on top, now to be known as the S-V stage. The C-2 model added a new S-III stage with two new 150,000 to 200,000 lbf (670 to 890 kN) engines, keeping the S-IV and S-V on top. The C-3 configuration added the S-II stage with four of these same engines, keeping only the S-III and S-IV on top. The C models easily outperformed the A's and B's, with the added advantage that they were interchangeable and could be built up in order to fit any needed payload requirement.

=== Saturn emerges ===
Of these new stage designs, only the S-IV would ever be delivered, and not in the form that was drawn up in the Committee report. In order to meet development schedules a cluster of six Centaur engines were placed in the new 220-inch (5.6 m) stage to produce the "new" S-IV of roughly the same performance as the original four upgraded engines. A large number of small engines are less efficient and more problematic than a smaller number of large engines, and this made it a target for an early upgrade to a single J-2. The resulting stage, the S-IVB, improved performance so much that the Saturn was able to launch the Apollo CSM, proving invaluable during the Apollo Project.

In the end, the Titan C was never delivered, and the Air Force instead turned to "thrust augmented" Titan IIs using clustered solid-fuel rockets. These new designs, the Titan IIIs, became the DoD's main heavy-lift launch vehicle for decades afterward as it cost significantly less to manufacture and fly, in part due to using hypergolic propellants that could be stored at room temperature. An important factor in this decision was that the DoD preferred to have a launch vehicle that they were in complete control of instead of having to share the Saturn with NASA. Of all Titan III/IV vehicles launched during its 40-year run, only a handful carried NASA payloads.

Likewise, the development of the Titan III eliminated the need for the "flexible" staging concepts of the Saturn, which was now only intended to be used for crewed launches in the Apollo program. With the need for flexibility in launch configuration removed, most of these designs were subsequently dropped. Only the S-V survived in its original form. The S-IV appeared in modified form and the Saturn V featured an entirely different S-II stage. The C-5 was confirmed as NASA's choice for the Apollo program in early 1962, and was named the Saturn V. The C-1 became the Saturn I. The C-1B became the Saturn IB.

The Saturn I made its maiden flight on 27 October 1961 with a dummy upper stage and partially fueled first stage. Tension in the blockhouse was high as no launch vehicle to date had been successful on the first attempt and there was the widespread fear of a pad explosion. As the Saturn was the largest booster yet flown, such an event was sure to be extremely destructive, possibly putting the launch complex out of use for six months.

In the end, these worries subsided as the booster lifted and performed a flawless test flight. Three more flights with dummy upper stages followed over the next 17 months, which were all completely or mostly successful. Two of them had the S-IV filled with water and detonated at high altitude after stage separation to form an ice cloud that was then photographed.

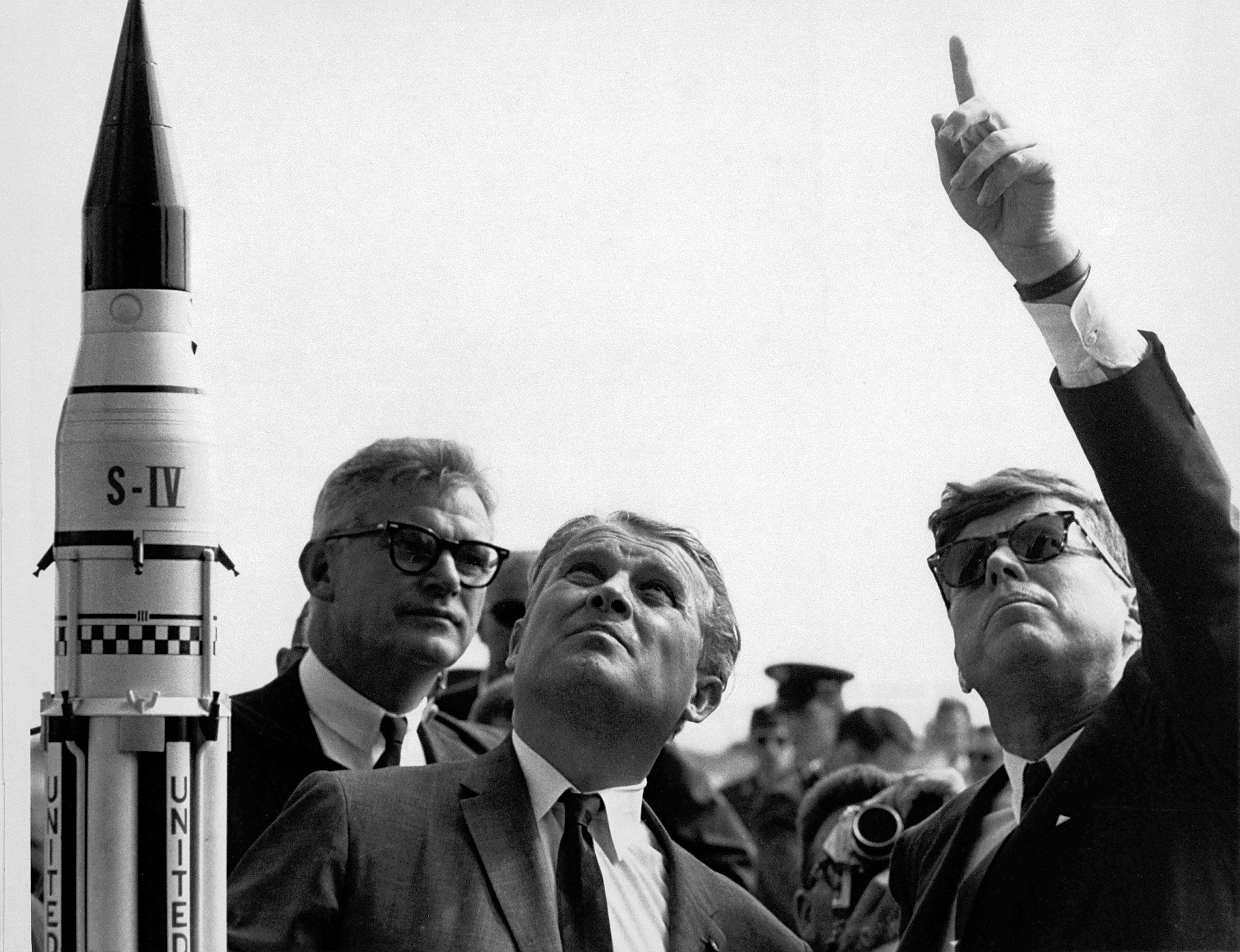
Von Braun, with JFK pointing at Saturn I at Cape Canaveral on 16 November 1963, weeks prior to its launch

Flight #5 in January 1964 was the first to carry a live S-IV, which restarted its engine in orbit to boost to a high altitude where it would remain until decaying two years later. Another two flights followed during the year with boilerplate Apollo CSMs.

By this point, the advent of the Titan III had robbed the Saturn of a role as a DoD launcher and with the newer, improved Saturn IB in development (as the Apollo CSM ended up being heavier than originally expected and so needed a more powerful launch vehicle), the booster quickly became orphaned and no practical use could be found for it.

== Uses in service ==
The main payload of the Saturn I was the boilerplate version of the Apollo Command and Service Modules and Launch Escape System. The final three also carried Pegasus micrometeoroid satellites in the second stage-spacecraft adapter.

The Saturn I was considered for launch of the X-20 Dyna-Soar spaceplane, and later, for launching a Gemini capsule on a proposed circumlunar mission. With funding of the Dyna-Soar cut in 1963 and Apollo development already far progressed, these proposals were however never realized.

Much later, Saturn I was also considered as a short range ballistic missile system in the TABAS concept. TABAS armed the Saturn with 25 metric tons (55,000 lb) of conventional weapons in a mechanical carrier system that ensured that the missile would hit and destroy an enemy runway, knocking it out of action for three days. The system was considered too dangerous to deploy; when launched it would appear to be a nuclear strike and might invite a response-in-kind.

== Description ==
=== Specifications ===
The S-V third stage was developed as the Centaur rocket stage, It was flown inactively four times on the Saturn I with the tanks filled with water. It never flew an active mission. The S-V would become an upper stage for the Atlas-Centaur and Titan III launch vehicles and their derivatives.

Parameter	S-I – 1st stage	S-IV – 2nd stage	S-V – 3rd stage
Height (m)	24.48	12.19	9.14
Diameter (m)	6.52	5.49	3.05
Gross mass (kg)	432,681	50,576	15,600
Empty mass (kg)	45,267	5,217	1,996
Engines	8 × H-1	6 × RL10	2 × RL10
Thrust (kN)	7,582	400	133
ISP (sec.)	288	410	425
ISP (km/s)	2.82	4.02	4.17
Burn duration (sec.)	150	482	430
Propellant	RP-1 / LOX	LH_{2} / LOX	LH_{2} / LOX

=== S-I stage ===
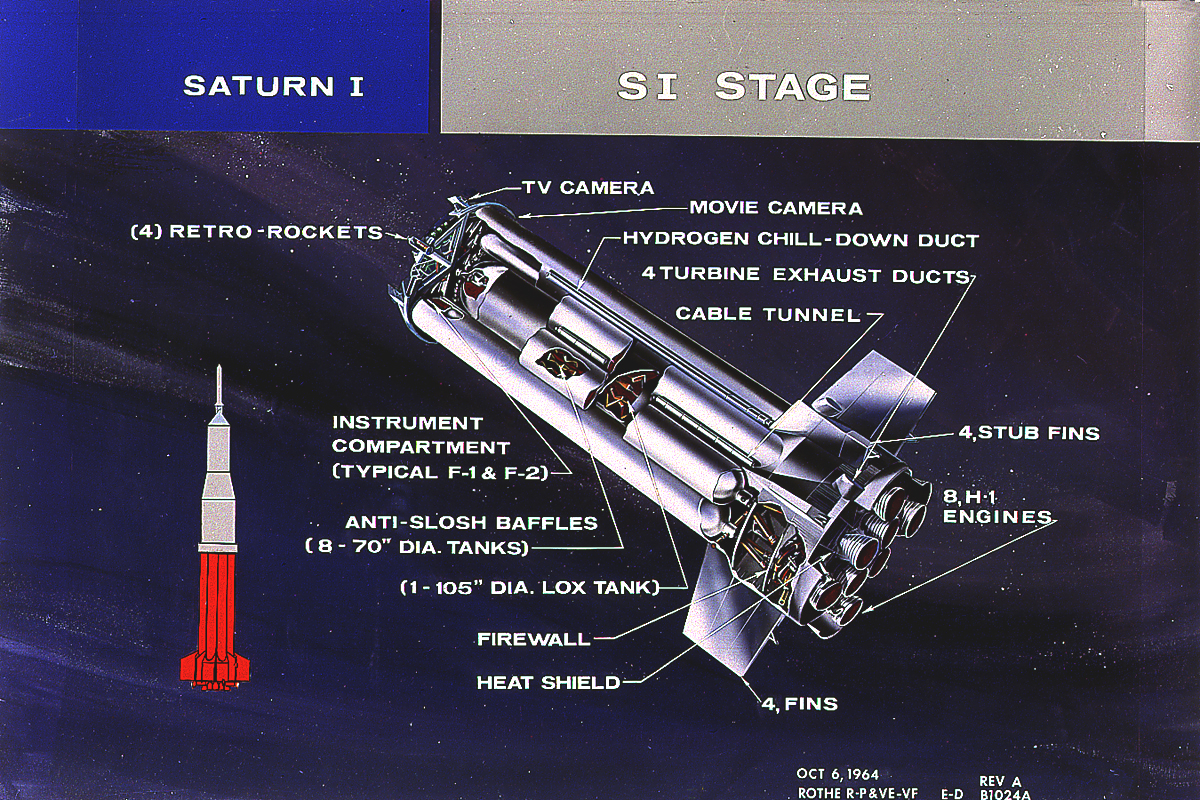
A diagram of the S-I first stage of the Saturn I

The S-I first stage was powered by eight H-1 rocket engines burning RP-1 fuel with liquid oxygen (LOX) as oxidizer. The propellant tanks consisted of a central Jupiter rocket tank containing LOX, surrounded by a cluster of eight Redstone rocket tanks: four painted white, containing LOX; and four painted black, containing the RP-1 fuel. The four outboard engines were mounted on gimbals, allowing them to be steered to guide the rocket. On the Block II vehicles (SA-5 through SA-10), eight fins provided aerodynamic stability in the flight through the atmosphere.

General characteristics

- Length: 80.3 feet (24.5 m)
- Diameter: 21.4 feet (6.5 m)

Engine

- 8 × H-1
  - Thrust: 1,500,000 pounds-force (6,700 kN)
  - Burn time: 150 seconds
  - Fuel: RP-1 / LOX

=== S-IV stage ===
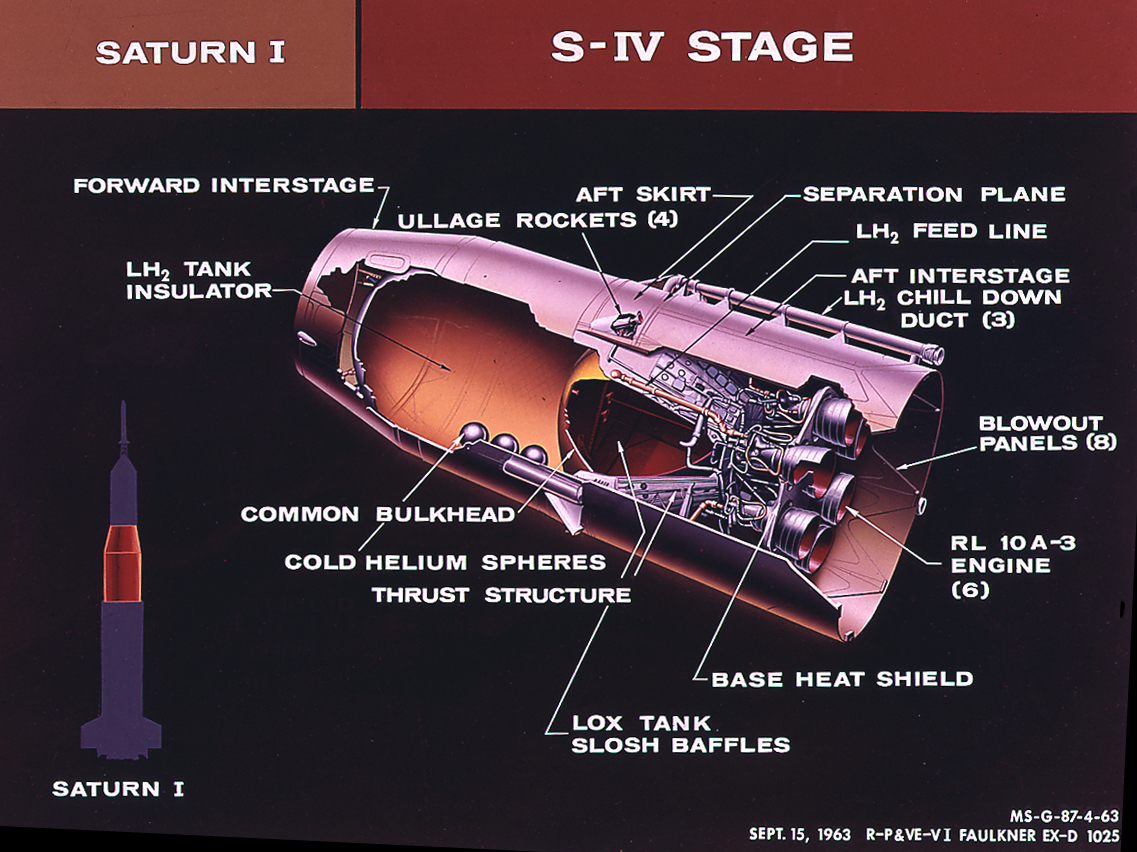
A diagram of the S-IV second stage of the Saturn I

The S-IV second stage was powered by six RL10 rocket engines burning liquid hydrogen (LH_{2}) as fuel with LOX as oxidizer, mounted on gimbals. The propellant tanks used a single, common bulkhead to separate the LOX and LH_{2} propellant tanks, saving 20% of structural weight along with the associated length and complexity of construction.

General characteristics

- Length: 40 feet (12 m)
- Diameter: 18 feet (5.5 m)

Engine

- 6 × RL10
  - Thrust: 90,000 pounds-force (400 kN)
  - Burn time: ~410 seconds
  - Fuel: LH_{2} / LOX

=== Saturn I Instrument Unit ===
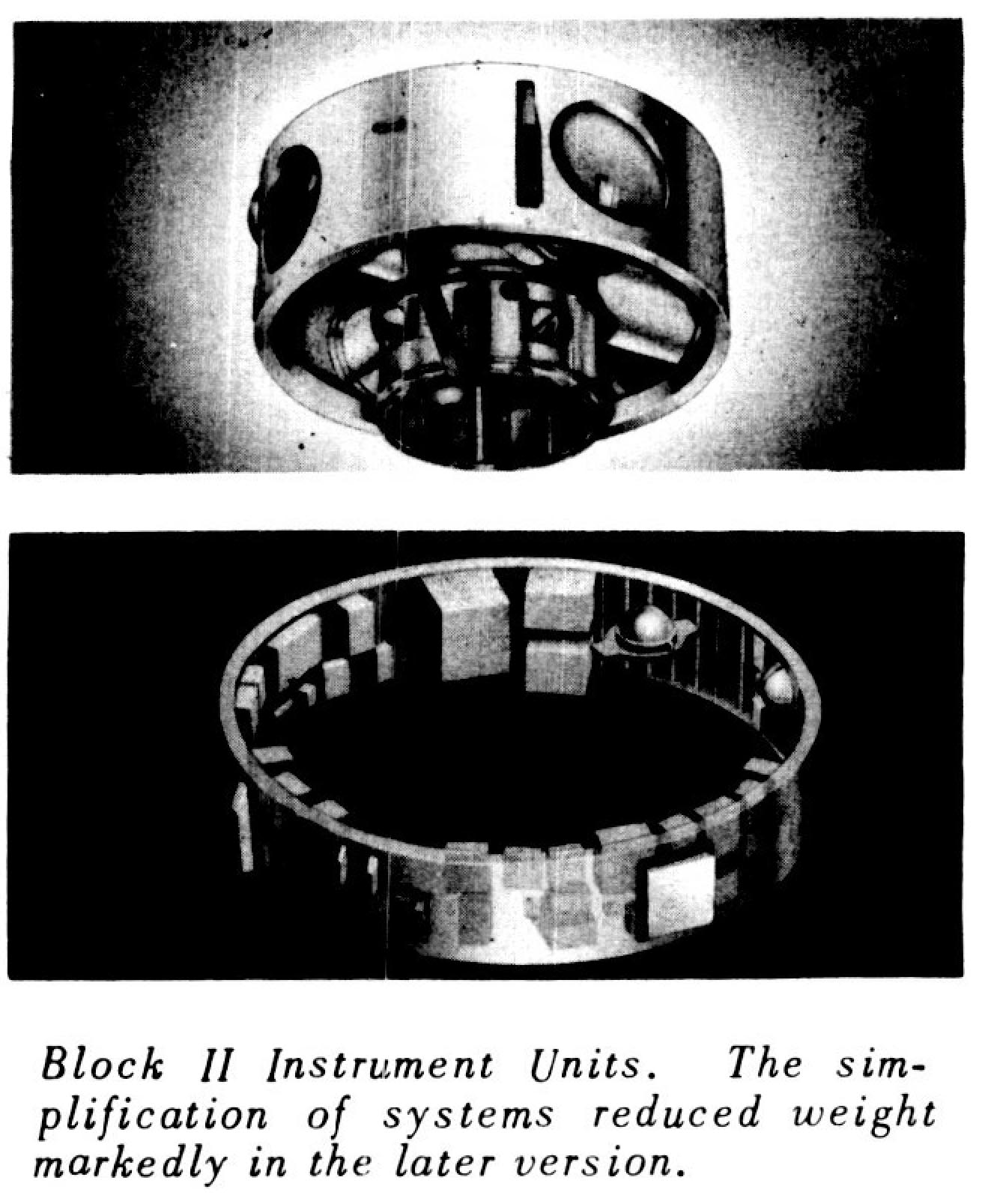
The version 1 (top) and the version 2 (bottom) of the Instrument Unit.

Saturn I Block I vehicles (SA-1 to SA-4) were guided by instruments carried in canisters on top of the S-I first stage, and included the ST-90 stabilized platform, made by Ford Instrument Company and used in the Redstone missile. These first four vehicles followed ballistic, non-orbital trajectories, and the dummy upper stages did not separate from the single powered stage.

The Block II vehicles (SA-5 to SA-10) included two powered stages, and went into orbits. Beginning with SA-5, the guidance instruments were carried on the instrument unit (IU), just ahead of the S-IV stage. The first version of the IU was 154 inches (3.9 m) in diameter and 58 inches (150 cm) high, and was both designed and built by Marshall Space Flight Center. Guidance, telemetry, tracking, and power components were contained in four pressurized, cylindrical containers attached like spokes to a central hub. This version flew on SA-5, SA-6, and SA-7.

MSFC flew version 2 of the IU on SA-8, SA-9, and SA-10. Version 2 was the same diameter as version 1, but only 34 inches (86 cm) high. Instead of pressurized containers, the components were hung on the inside of the cylindrical wall, achieving a reduction in weight.

The guidance computer for Block II was the IBM ASC-15. Other instruments carried by the IU included active components, that guided the vehicle; and passenger components, that telemetered data to the ground for test and evaluation for use in later flights. The ST-90 stabilized platform was the active IMU for SA-5 and the first stage of SA-6. The ST-124 was the passenger on SA-5 and active for the second stage of SA-6 and subsequent missions. The IU had an optical window to allow alignment of the inertial platform before launch.

=== S-V stage ===
Saturn S-V stage illustration

The S-V stage was intended to be powered by two RL-10A-1 engines burning liquid hydrogen as fuel and liquid oxygen as oxidizer. The propellant tanks used a common bulkhead to separate the propellants.

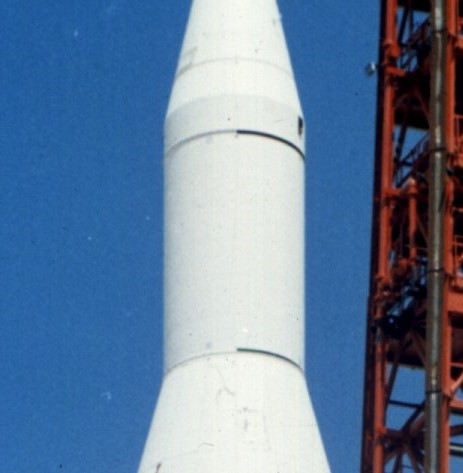
The S-V stage on SA-4.

The S-V stage was flown four times on missions SA-1 to SA-4. All four of these missions had the S-V's tanks filled with water to be used a ballast during launch. The stage was never flown in an active configuration on any Saturn launch vehicle. This stage was also used on the Atlas-LV3C as the Centaur, modern derivatives of which are still flown today, making it the only Saturn rocket stage still currently operating.

General characteristics

- Length: 29.9 feet (9.1 m)
- Diameter: 10 feet (3.0 m)

Engine

- 2 × RL10
  - Thrust: 29,899 pounds-force (133.00 kN)
  - Burn time: ~430 seconds
  - Fuel: LH_{2} / LOX

== Saturn I launches ==
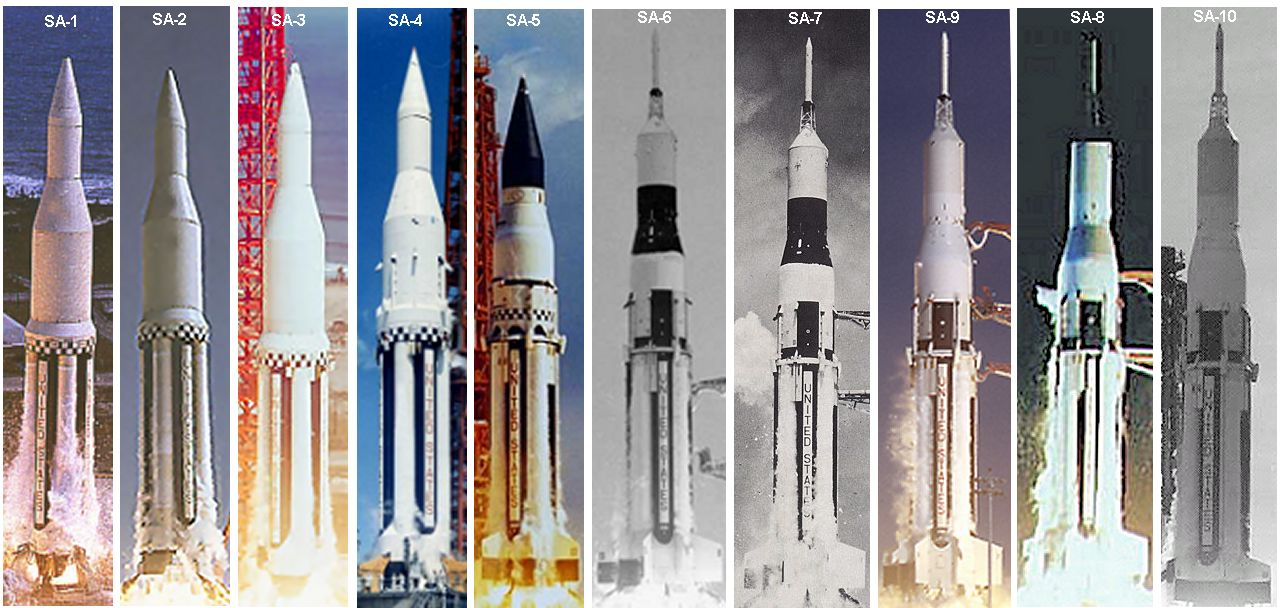
Saturn I rocket profiles SA-1 to SA-10

Serial number	Mission	Launch date (UTC)	Notes
SA-1	SA-1	October 27, 1961; 15:06:04	First test flight. Block I. Suborbital. Range: 398 km. Apogee: 136.5 km. Apogee Mass: 115,700 lb (52,500 kg). Dummy S-IV and S-V stages.
SA-2	SA-2	April 25, 1962; 14:00:34	Second test flight. Block I. Suborbital. 86,000 kg water released at apogee of 145 km, first Project Highwater launch. Dummy S-IV and S-V stages.
SA-3	SA-3	November 16, 1962; 17:45:02	Third test flight. Block I. Suborbital. 86,000 kg water released at apogee of 167 km, second Project Highwater launch. Dummy S-IV and S-V stages.
SA-4	SA-4	March 28, 1963; 20:11:55	Fourth test flight. Block I. Suborbital. Dummy S-IV second stage and S-V third stage. Apogee: 129 km. Range: 400 km.
SA-5	SA-5	January 29, 1964; 16:25:01	First live S-IV second stage. First Block II. First to orbit: 760 x 264 km. Mass: 38,700 lb (17,550 kg). Decayed 30 April 1966. JFK identified this launch as the one which would place US lift capability ahead of the Soviets, after being behind since Sputnik.
SA-6	AS-101	May 28, 1964; 17:07:00	First Apollo boilerplate CSM launch. Block II. Orbit: 204 x 179 km. Mass: 38,900 lb (17,650 kg). Apollo BP-13 decayed 1 June 1964.
SA-7	AS-102	September 18, 1964; 16:22:43	Second Apollo boilerplate CSM launch. Block II. Orbit: 203 x 178 km. Mass: 36,800 lb (16,700 kg). Apollo BP-15 decayed 22 September 1964.
SA-9	AS-103	February 16, 1965; 14:37:03	Third Apollo boilerplate CSM. First Pegasus micrometeoroid satellite. Orbit: 523 x 430 km. Mass: 3,200 lb (1,450 kg). Pegasus 1 decayed 17 September 1978. Apollo BP-26 decayed 10 July 1985.
SA-8	AS-104	May 25, 1965; 07:35:01	Fourth Apollo boilerplate CSM. Only night launch. Second Pegasus micrometeoroid satellite. Orbit: 594 x 467 km. Mass: 3,200 lb (1,450 kg). Pegasus 2 decayed 3 November 1979. Apollo BP-16 decayed 8 July 1989.
SA-10	AS-105	July 30, 1965; 13:00:00	Third Pegasus micrometeoroid satellite. Orbit: 567 x 535 km. Mass: 3,200 lb (1,450 kg). Pegasus 3 decayed 4 August 1969. Apollo BP-9A decayed 22 November 1975.

For further launches of Saturn-1 series vehicles, see the Saturn IB page.

== Saturn I rockets on display ==
As of 2021, there are three locations where Saturn I test vehicles (or parts thereof) are on display:

=== Block 1 test vehicles ===
SA-T First Saturn I Static Test stage. Manufactured at Marshall Space Flight Center, used in several MSFC static firing tests from 1960, then shipped and used at the Michoud Assembly Facility for fit testing, before being returned to Alabama. Now on horizontal display, next to the static test tower at Marshall Space Flight Center. In 2019, it was reported that this stage has been made available by NASA for donation to an organization, with the only provision being an approximately $250,000 "shipping fee" for transportation costs.

With apparently no inquiries by qualified institutions to obtain the SA-T stage, the booster was demolished on or around April 4, 2022.

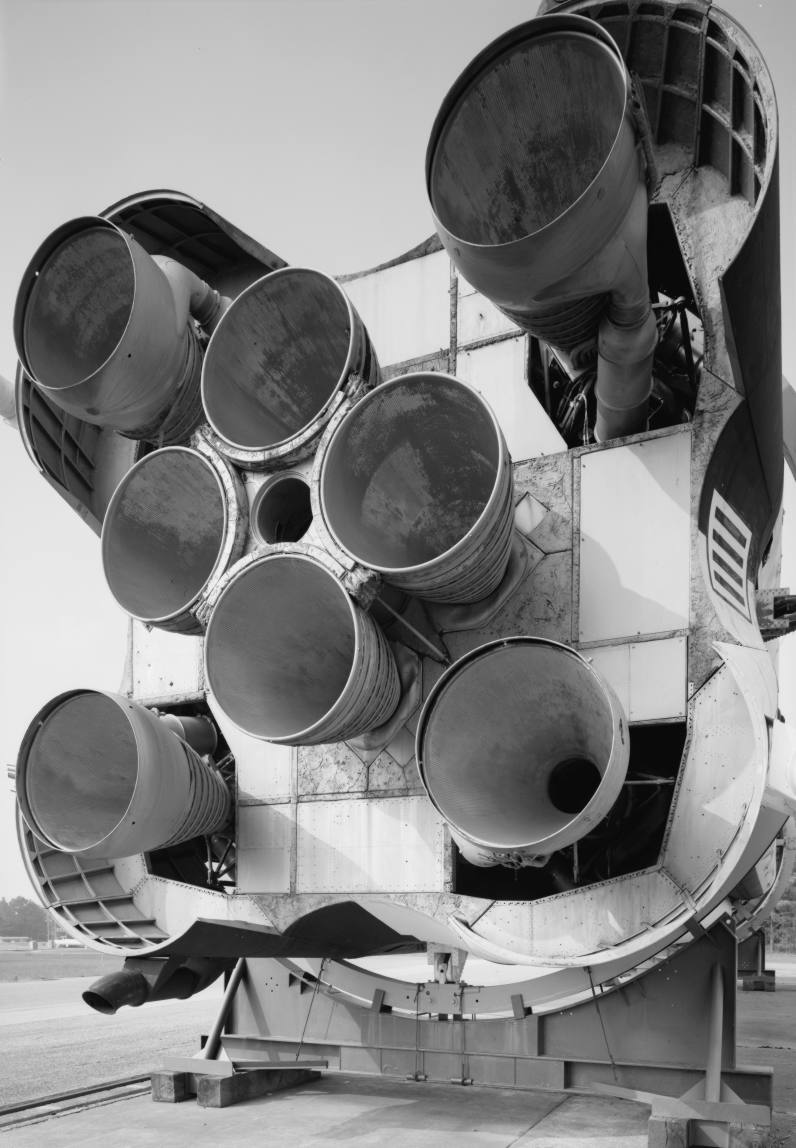
SA-T, located on the north side of MSFC Static Test Stand, 1965.

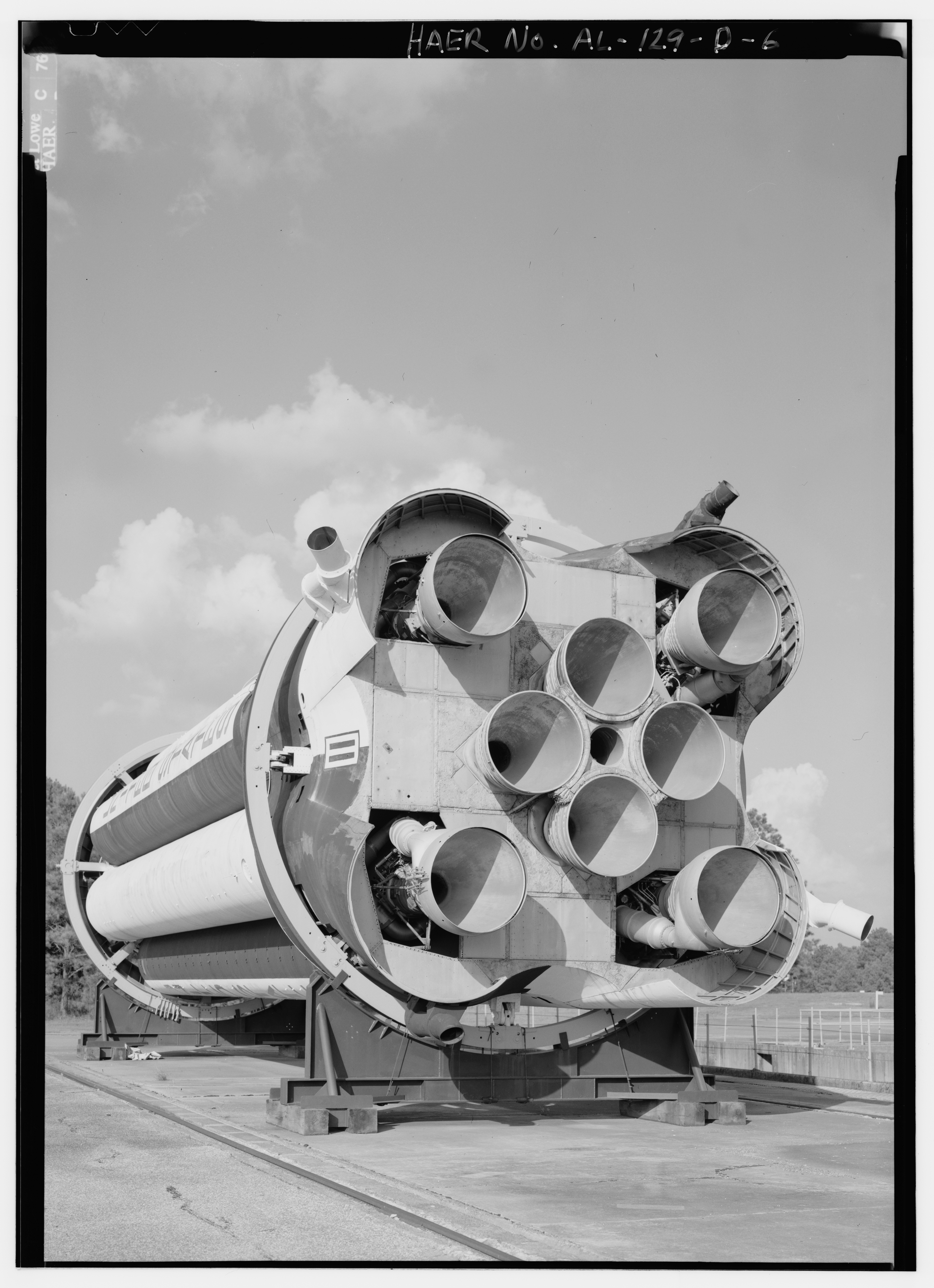
SA-T at MSFC

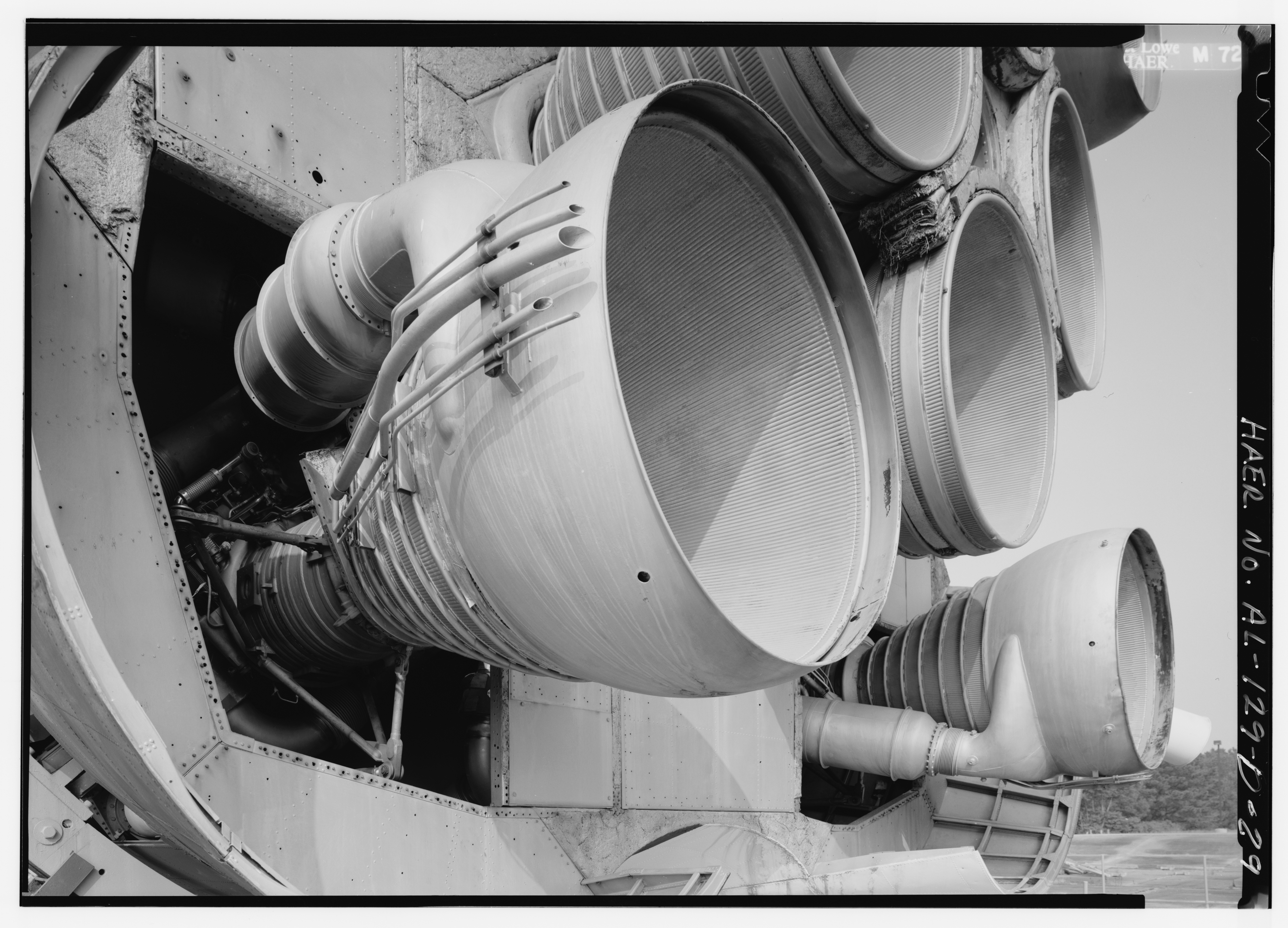
Alternate photo of SA-T at MSFC.

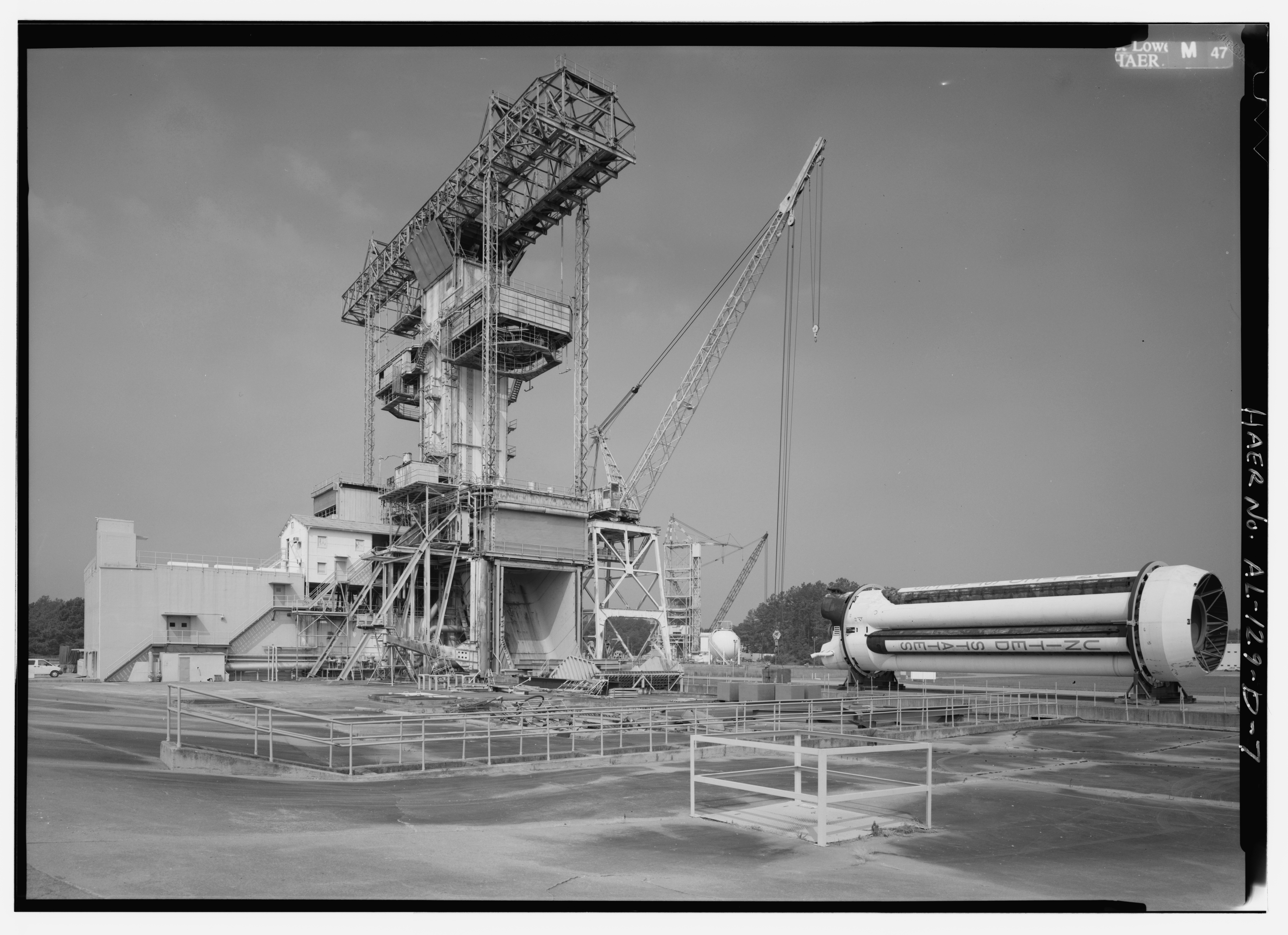
MSFC Static Test Stand, SA-T at bottom right.

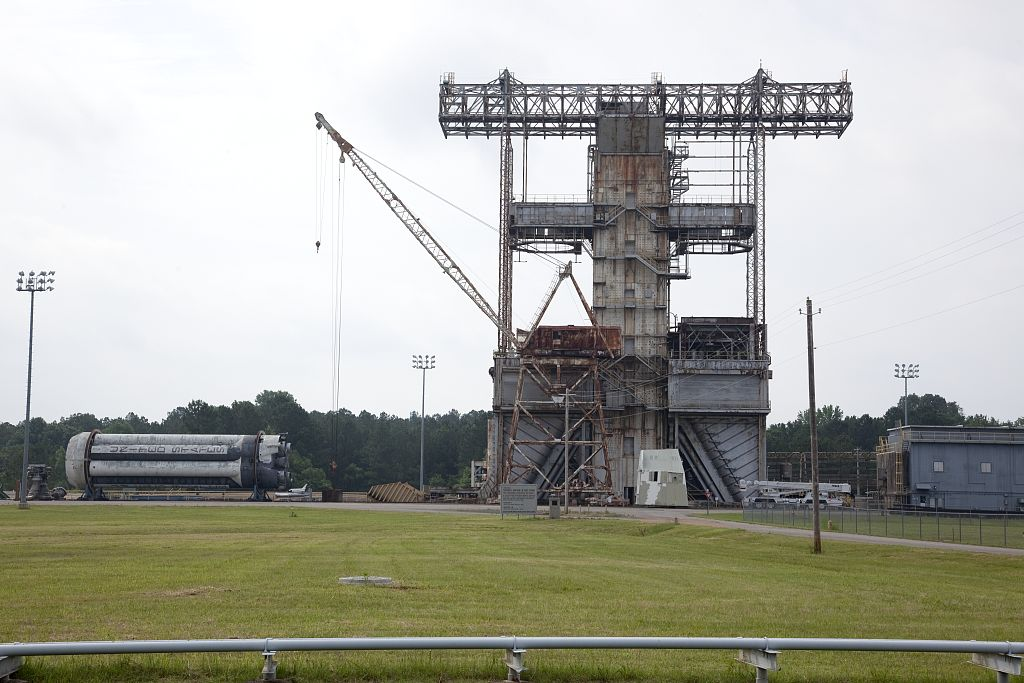
MSFC Static Test Stand, with SA-T at the left.

SA-D Saturn I Block 1 Dynamic Test Vehicle. Manufactured at MSFC, used in several MSFC dynamic tests through 1961. Now on display in a vertical position with dummy upper stage in the rocket garden near MSFC headquarters, alongside several examples of heritage vehicles such as the V-2 rocket (A4), Redstone, Jupiter-C and Jupiter IRBM.

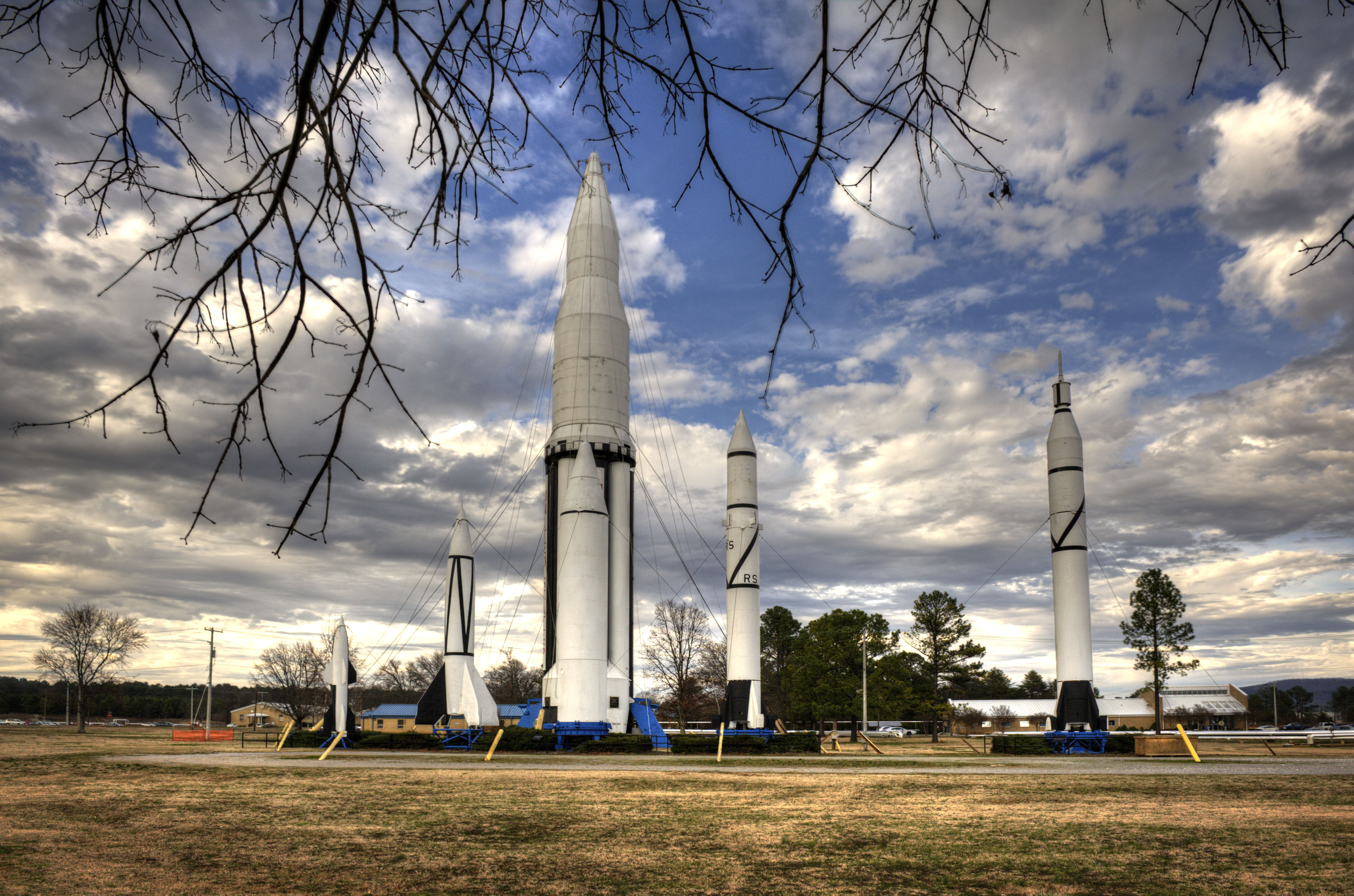
SA-D at the back, between other rockets developed at MSFC.

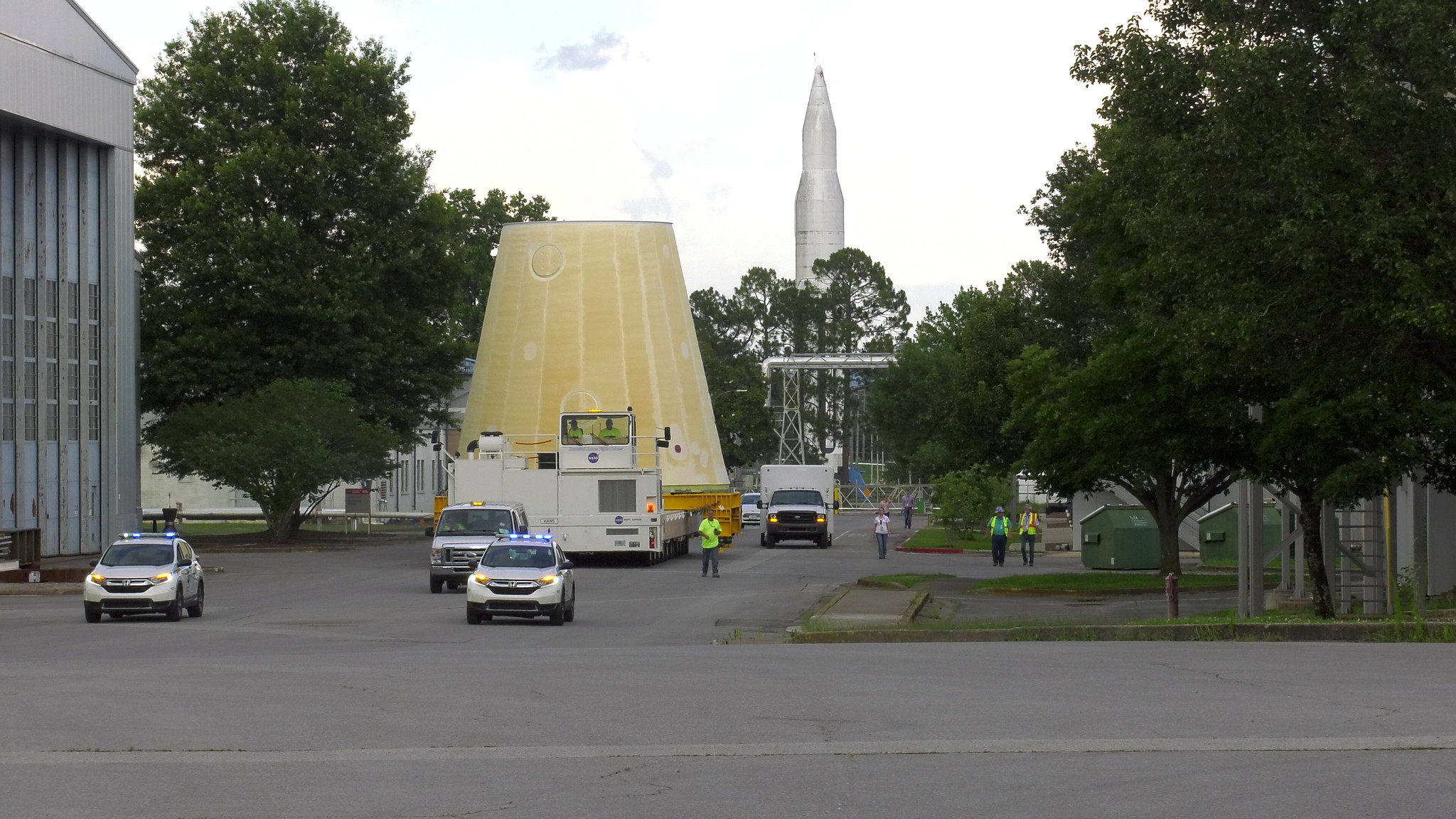
NASA moving the SLS launch vehicle stage adapter, with SA-D at the back.

=== Block 2 test vehicle ===
SA-D5 Block 2 Dynamic Test Vehicle - consists of S-I-D5 Booster stage and S-IV-H/D hydrostatic/dynamic upper stage, used in tests at MSFC dynamic stand in 1962. It was also shipped and used for checkout at LC-37B at Cape Canaveral in 1963. It was returned to Alabama and modified for use as an S-IB dynamic test stage. Donated by NASA/MSFC to the State of Alabama at the same time as the Saturn V Dynamic Test Vehicle and now on display in a vertical position at the U.S. Space and Rocket Center (formerly Alabama Space and Rocket Center), Huntsville, Alabama, where it has become a very familiar local landmark.

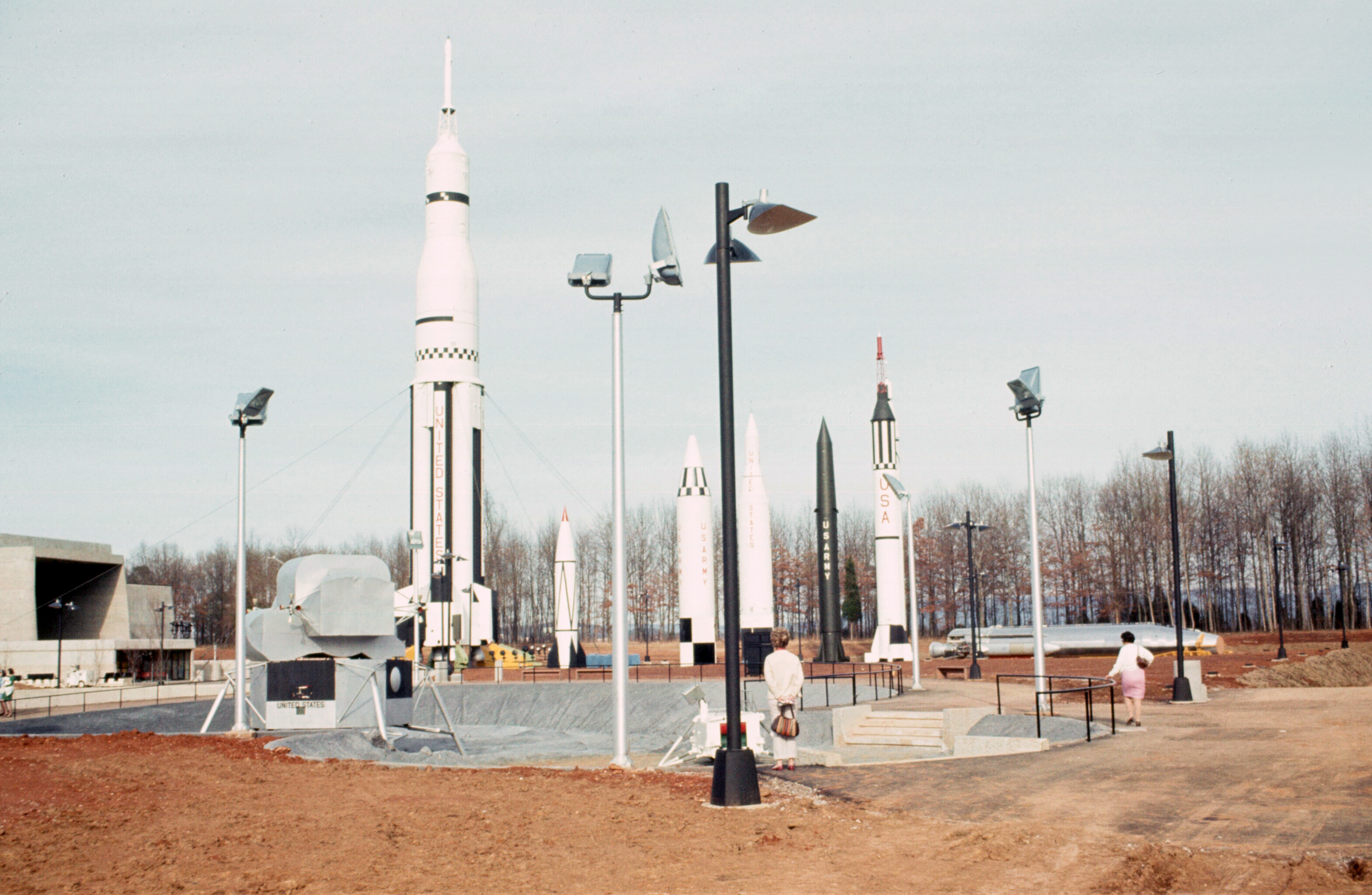
SA-D5 (left) at the Alabama Space and Rocket Center, 1970

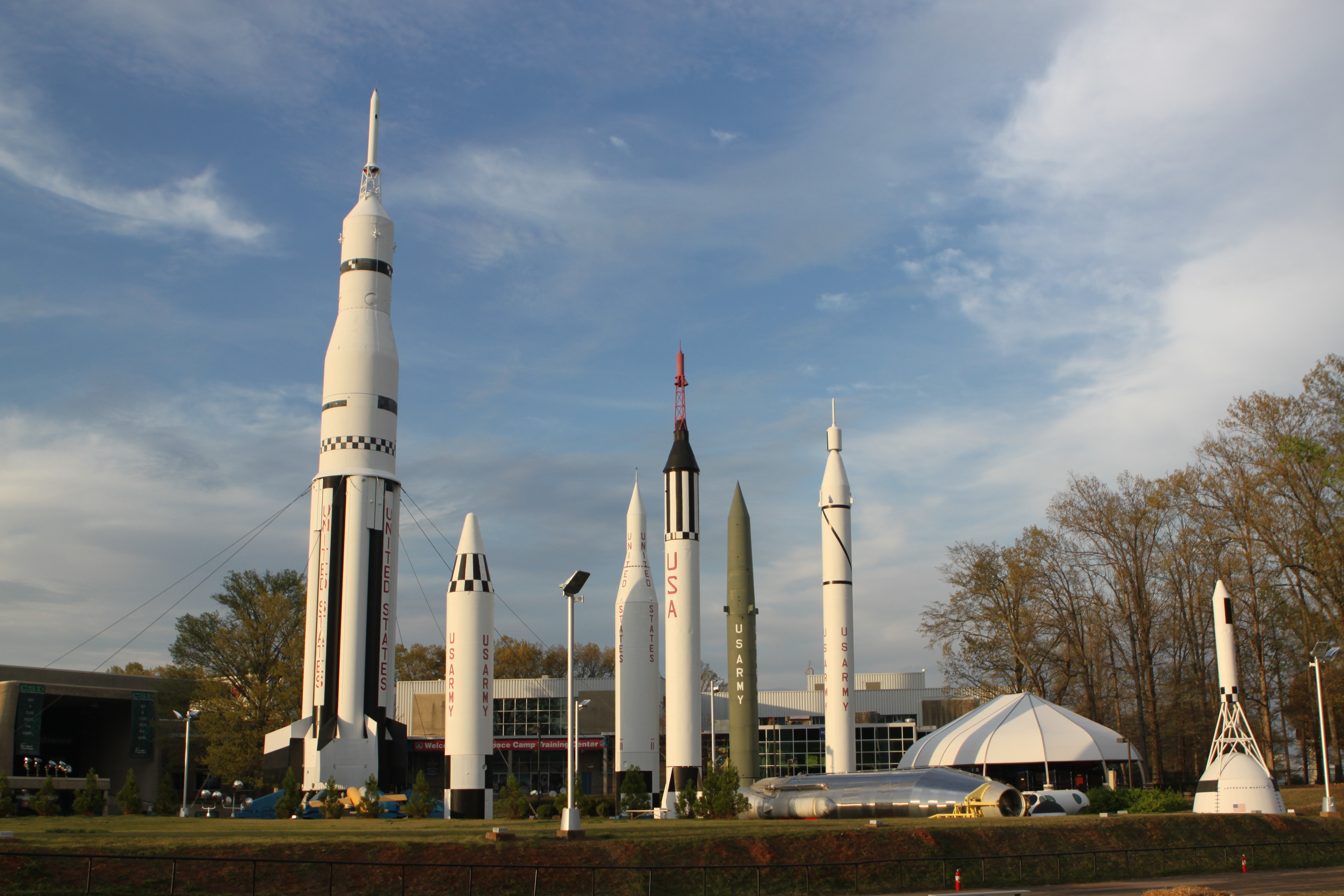
SA-D5 (left) at the U.S. Space & Rocket Center, 2011.

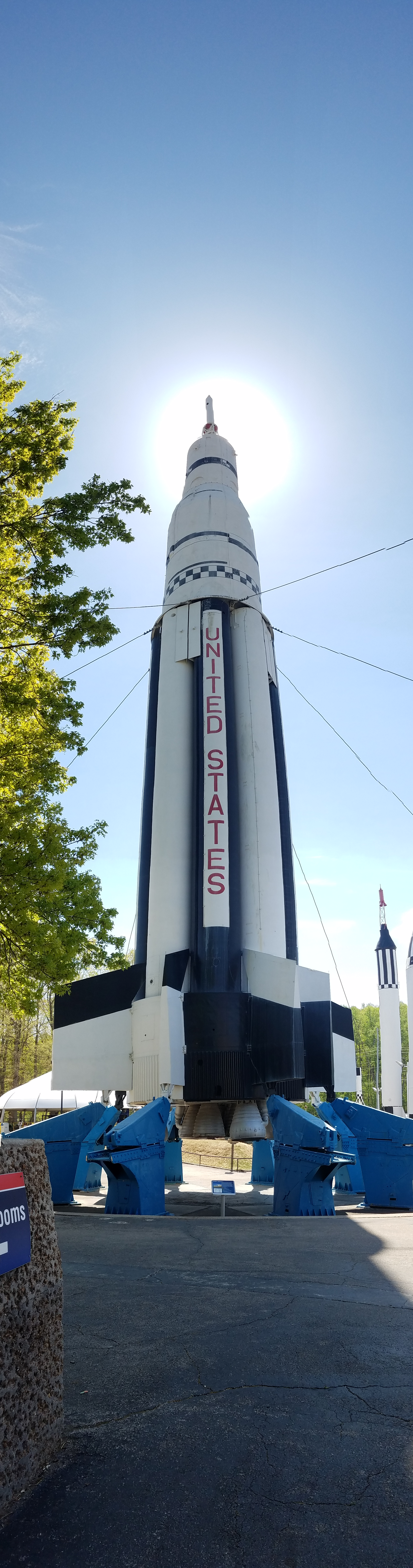
SA-D5 at the U.S. Space & Rocket Center, 2017.

== See also ==
- Comparison of orbital launchers families
- Comparison of orbital launch systems
