= Saturn I SA-5 =

Apollo program test launch

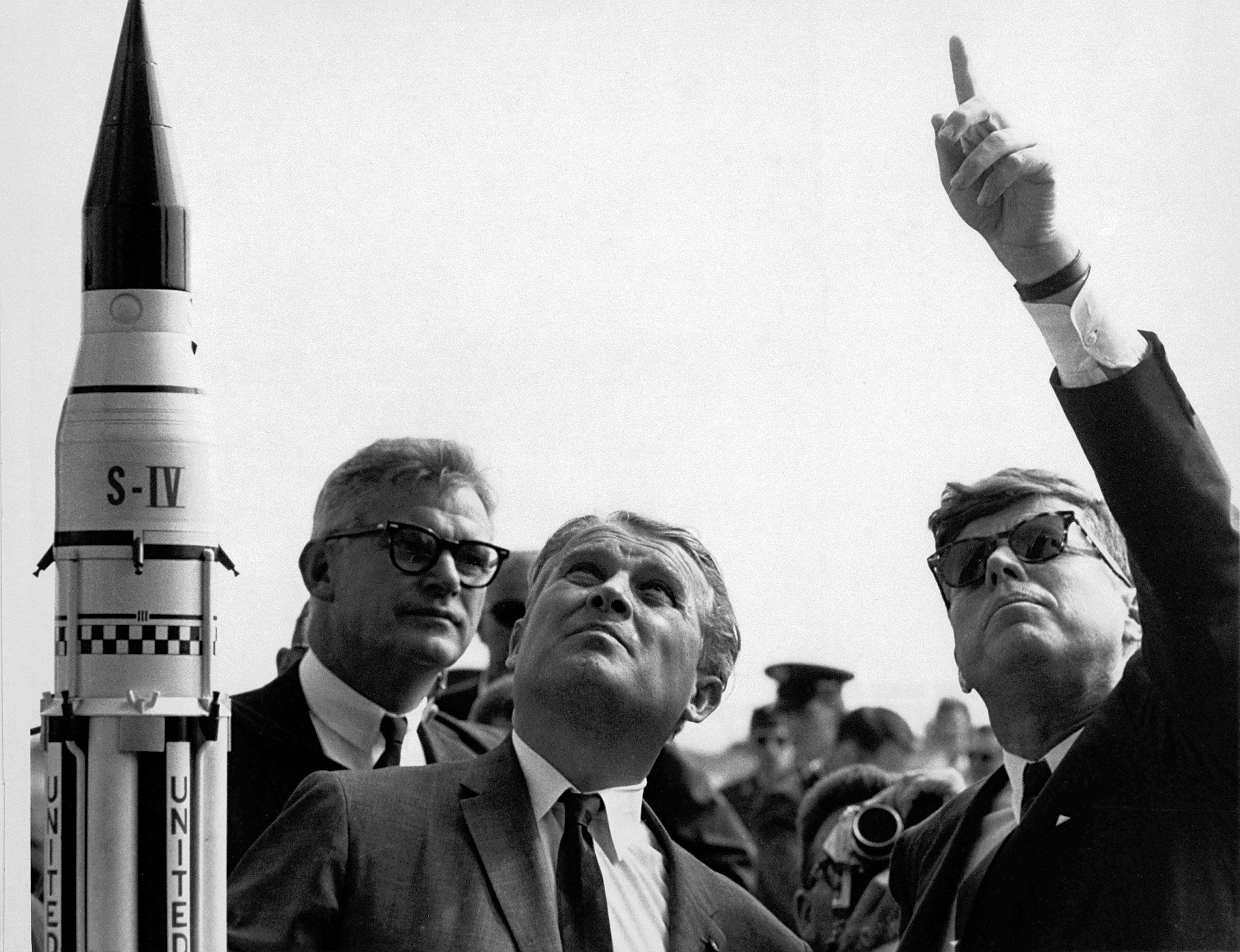
- Wernher von Braun and John F. Kennedy with a model of the SA-5 vehicle on November 16, 1963, 2 months prior to launch
- Mission type: Test flight
- Operator: NASA
- COSPAR ID: 1964-005A
- SATCAT no.: 744
- Mission duration: 791 days
- Distance travelled: 519,463,719 kilometers (280,487,969 nmi)
- Orbits completed: ~12,000

Spacecraft properties
- Spacecraft type: Jupiter nosecone and ballast
- Launch mass: 17,600 kilograms (38,700 lb)

Start of mission
- Launch date: January 29, 1964, 16:25:01 UTC
- Rocket: Saturn I SA-5
- Launch site: Cape Kennedy LC-37B

End of mission
- Decay date: April 30, 1966

Orbital parameters
- Reference system: Geocentric
- Regime: Low Earth
- Perigee altitude: 258 kilometers (139 nmi)
- Apogee altitude: 741 kilometers (400 nmi)
- Inclination: 31.4 degrees
- Period: 94.61 minutes
- Epoch: 3 March 1964

Saturn-Apollo 5 (SA-5) was the first launch of the Block II Saturn I rocket and was part of the Apollo program. In 1963, President Kennedy identified this launch as the one which would place US lift capability ahead of the Soviets, after being behind for more than six years since Sputnik.

== Upgrades and objectives ==
The major changes that occurred on SA-5 were that for the first time the Saturn I would fly with two stages - the S-I first stage and the S-IV second stage. The second stage featured six engines burning liquid hydrogen. Although this engine design (RL10) was meant to be tested several years earlier in the Centaur upper stage, in the end the first Centaur was launched only two months before SA-5. This rocket stage was delivered to the Cape by a modified B-377 aircraft, the Aero Spacelines Pregnant Guppy.

Other major design change included the enlargement of the fuel tanks on the first stage. For the first time the rocket would carry its planned 750,000 lb (340,000 kg) of propellant and would use eight upgraded engines producing a thrust each of 188,000 lbf (836 kN). The first stage also featured for the first time eight fins for added stability during flight. As with the earlier flight the rocket would still carry only a Jupiter nosecone instead of a boilerplate Apollo spacecraft.

Also the guidance and control computer on the rocket was positioned above the second stage. This was where it would be located on Saturn V flights. The Instrument Unit controlled the ascent of the rocket through the atmosphere, automatically compensating for any winds or loss of thrust during the ascent.

For the first time in the Apollo program, this flight would be an orbital mission. This was possible because of the upgraded first stage and the addition of the second stage. It would enter into an elliptical orbit and re-enter later as its orbit decayed.

President Kennedy referred specifically to this launch in a speech at Brooks AFB in San Antonio, Texas, on November 21, 1963, the day before he was assassinated. He said:

And in December, while I do not regard our mastery of space as anywhere near complete, while I recognize that there are still areas where we are behind – at least in one area, the size of the booster – this year I hope the United States will be ahead.

== Flight ==
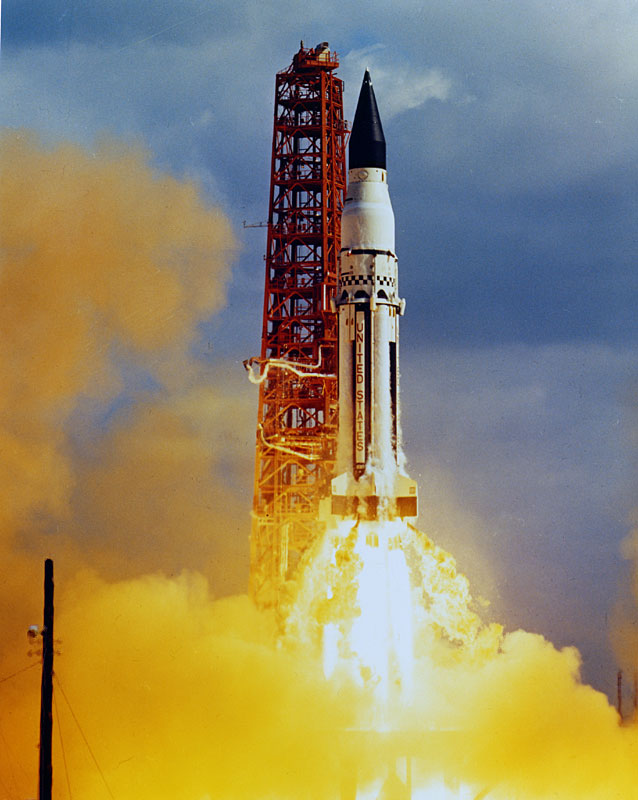
Launch of the first Block II Saturn I (NASA)

The first scheduled launch attempt was for 27 January 1964, with all going well until 93% of the liquid oxygen (LOX) had been loaded into the first stage. At this time, the ground crews switched it from a fast fill to a replenish system. However, the LOX in the tanks began to fall, i.e., it was not being replenished. The cause was found to be a blind flange (a plate without an opening) in the line. This could not be removed easily and the launch had to be postponed for two days.

The second launch attempt had no such problems and lifted off into overcast skies at January 29, 1964, 11:25 EST. The rocket sent back 1,183 measurements to the ground during the flight while at the same time it was tracked by six telescopes. For the first 1000 meters the rocket was filmed by 13 cameras that looked for any pitch, yaw, and roll movements.

The separation of the two rocket stages was filmed by eight cameras that themselves separated from the rocket to be recovered 800 kilometers (430 nmi) downrange in the Atlantic Ocean. The whole stage separation system worked perfectly with the retrorockets firing on the first stage to decelerate it and ullage rockets on the S-IV firing to settle its fuel to aft of the stage.

After an eight-minute burn, the second stage entered into a 262-by-785-kilometer (141 by 424 nmi) orbit. At 16,965 kg (37,401 lb) it was the largest satellite ever to go into orbit at that time. However, the achievement of Earth orbit was not an objective of the mission but merely a bonus. It did show to the American public that the United States could build launch vehicles as large as those of the Soviet Union.
