= AS-101 =

1964 Apollo Program test flight

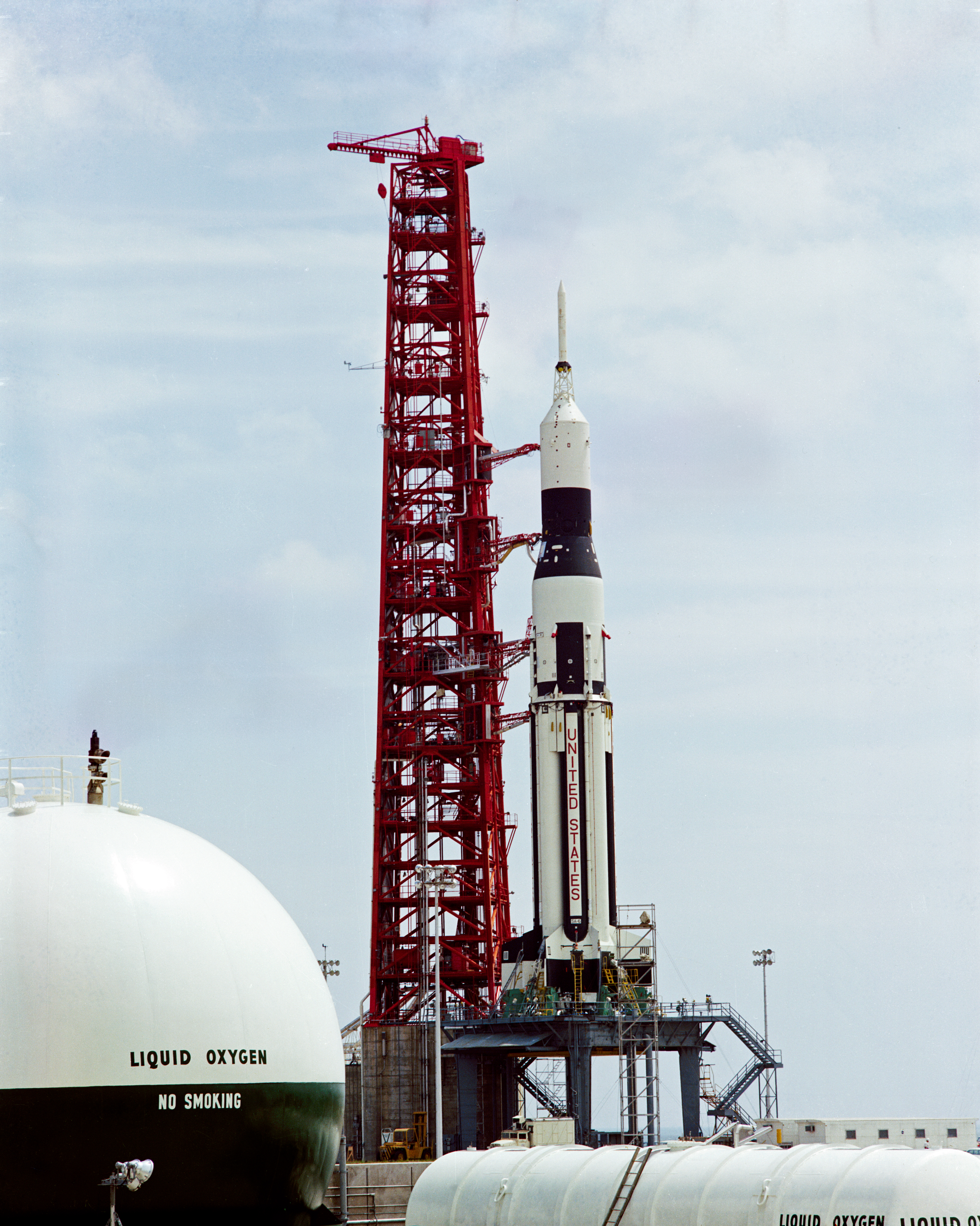
- AS-101 (SA-6)
- Mission type: Spacecraft aerodynamics
- Operator: NASA
- COSPAR ID: 1964-025A
- SATCAT no.: 800
- Mission duration: ~5 hours, 53 minutes
- Orbits completed: 54

Spacecraft properties
- Spacecraft: Apollo BP-13
- Launch mass: 7,700 kilograms (17,000 lb)

Start of mission
- Launch date: May 28, 1964, 17:07:00 UTC
- Rocket: Saturn I SA-6
- Launch site: Cape Kennedy LC-37B

End of mission
- Disposal: Uncontrolled reentry
- Last contact: May 28, 1964 after 4 orbits
- Decay date: June 1, 1964

Orbital parameters
- Reference system: Geocentric
- Regime: Low Earth orbit
- Perigee altitude: 178 kilometers (96 nmi)
- Apogee altitude: 199 kilometers (107 nmi)
- Inclination: 31.7 degrees
- Period: 88.26 minutes
- Epoch: 30 May 1964

AS-101 (Apollo Saturn-101) (also designated SA-6) was the sixth flight of the Saturn I launch vehicle, which carried the first boilerplate Apollo spacecraft into low Earth orbit. The test took place on May 28, 1964, lasting for four orbits (about six hours). The spacecraft and its upper stage completed a total of 54 orbits before reentering the atmosphere and crashing in the Pacific Ocean on June 1, 1964.

The flight experienced a single anomaly: one of the eight first-stage Saturn I engines shut down early, but the guidance system compensated by burning the remaining seven engines longer. AS-101 was followed by four more flights to verify the launch aerodynamics of the Apollo command and service module (CSM) and its launch escape system (LES) tower.

== Boilerplate Apollo ==
The first five launches of the Saturn I had carried Jupiter nosecones, a proven design which allowed engineers to focus on development of the rocket. To verify the launch aerodynamics of the CSM, AS-101 carried BP-13, a boilerplate spacecraft that weighed 17,000 pounds (7,700 kg) and duplicated the size and shape of the CSM, and a dummy LES tower. A flight-weight command module (CM) weighed around 12,000 pounds (5,400 kg). The boilerplate spacecraft was instrumented with 116 sensors reading strain, pressure, temperature, heat flux, and acceleration.

== Flight ==
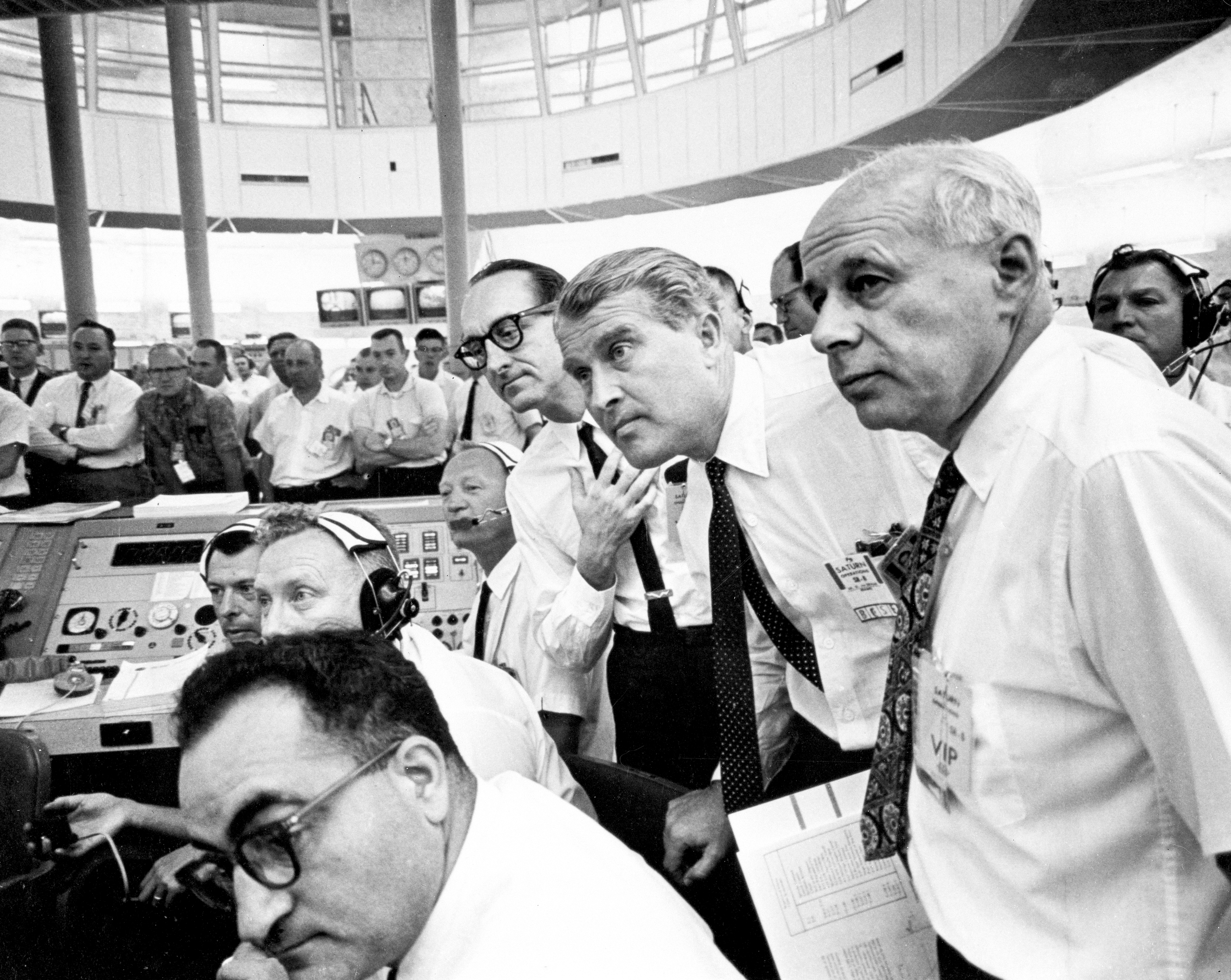
George Mueller, Wernher von Braun, and Eberhard Rees (MSFC Director for Research and Development) watch the AS-101 launch from the firing room.

It took three attempts to launch the rocket from Cape Kennedy Air Force Station Space Launch Complex 37B. The first attempt was scrubbed after the liquid oxygen damaged a wire mesh screen during a test, causing fuel contamination. The second attempt was scrubbed after the rocket's guidance system overheated due to failure of an air conditioning compressor.

The vehicle finally lifted off on May 28, 1964. There had been several delays during the countdown as liquid oxygen vapors obscured an optical window in the SA-6's instrument unit, so that a ground-based theodolite could not see it. This theodolite was required by the countdown computer in order for launch to proceed. Engineers deemed it non-critical and reprogrammed the computer, allowing the launch to proceed.

The ascent was normal up to 116.9 seconds after liftoff, at which point engine number eight shut off early. This was not planned, as it had been on SA-4 as a test, but the rocket compensated perfectly by burning the remaining fuel in the other seven engines for 2.7 seconds longer than planned. The first stage separated and the second stage ignited. Ten seconds later, the launch escape system was jettisoned as planned. Also jettisoned from the first stage were eight film cameras that observed separation of the stages.

The second stage cut off at 624.5 seconds after launch (1.26 seconds earlier than predicted), with the stage and boilerplate spacecraft in a 182 kilometers (98 nautical miles) by 227 kilometers (123 nautical miles) orbit. It continued to transmit data for four orbits, after which the batteries failed. The vehicle made a total of 54 orbits, re-entering the atmosphere east of Kanton Island in the Pacific Ocean on June 1.

== Engine failure cause ==
Engineers were quick to find the cause of the failure of engine number eight. The teeth on one of the gears in the turbopump were stripped off. This did not cause any delays in the next launches as engineers had already decided that the gear design was inferior and were planning to change it for the next launch. This was the only problem encountered with an H-1 engine during a flight.
