= Saturn I SA-1 =

1961 mission in NASA's Apollo spaceflight program

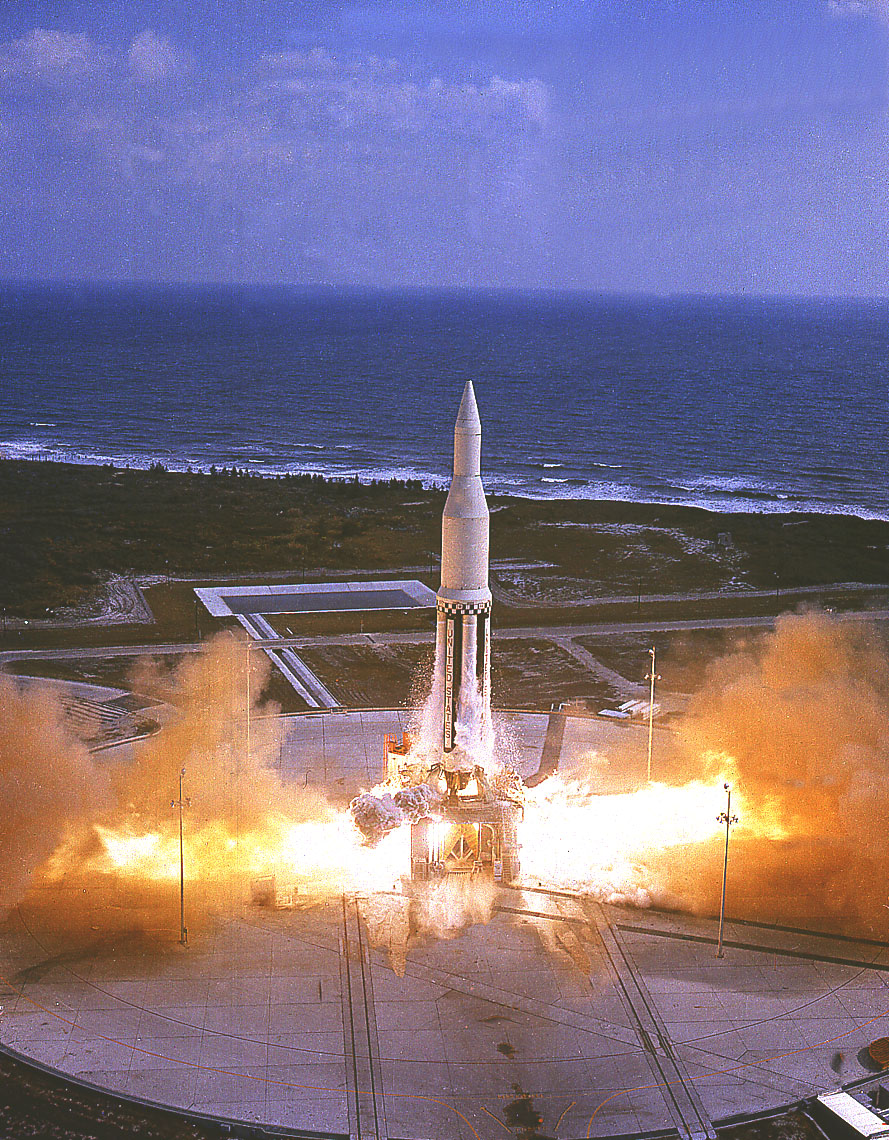
- SA-1 lifting off
- Mission type: Test flight
- Operator: NASA
- Mission duration: 15 minutes
- Distance travelled: 331.5 kilometers (206.0 mi)
- Apogee: 136.2 kilometers (84.6 mi)

Spacecraft properties
- Launch mass: 52,480 kilograms (115,700 lb)

Start of mission
- Launch date: October 27, 1961, 15:06:04 UTC
- Rocket: Saturn I SA-1
- Launch site: Cape Canaveral LC-34

End of mission
- Decay date: October 27, 1961, 15:21:04 UTC

Saturn-Apollo 1 (SA-1) was the first flight of the Saturn I space launch vehicle, the first in the Saturn family, and first mission of the American Apollo program. The rocket was launched on October 27, 1961, from Cape Canaveral, Florida.

== Objectives ==
The Saturn I booster was a huge increase in size and power over anything previously launched. It was three times taller, required six times more fuel and produced ten times more thrust than the Juno I rocket that had launched the first American satellite, Explorer 1, into orbit in 1958.

At the time, NASA had decided to not use all-up testing, when an entire system is tested at once. The agency planned to test each rocket stage in separate launches, so for SA-1 the only live stage was the S-I first stage.

This first flight was designed to test the structure of the launch vehicle during a suborbital flight using the nose cone from a Jupiter rocket.

== Preparation ==
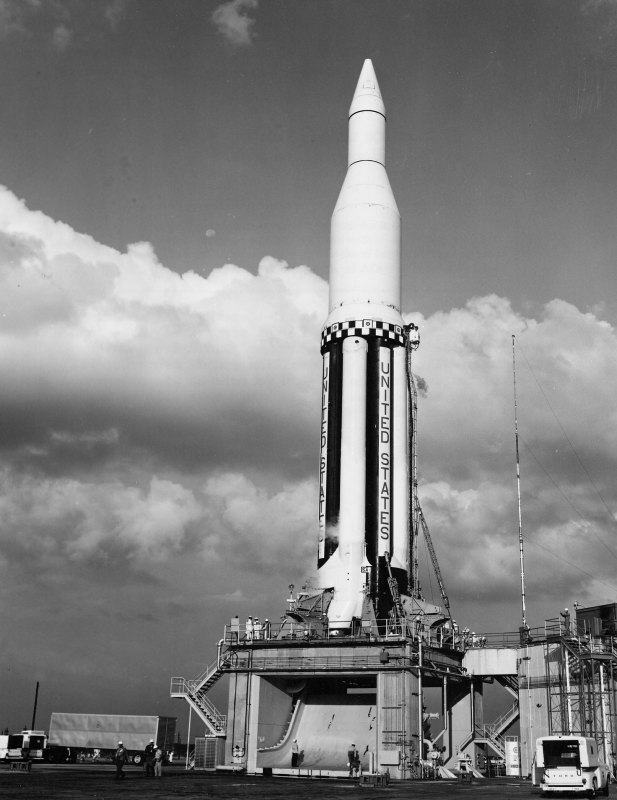
SA-1 before launch

As this was the first Saturn flight, the systems were still being developed. It was the first time that a stage had been delivered to Cape Canaveral by barge and it demonstrated this could be done for the larger stages of future Saturn rockets. The first stage and the two dummy upper stages arrived on August 15, 1961, on the barge Compromise. It had encountered some problems on the voyage, running aground four times due to poor nautical charts. On the return trip, the barge hit a bridge, causing some minor damage.

The booster was erected at Pad 34 five days later with little trouble. Testing proceeded, albeit a little behind schedule. At this time, testing was not automated and amounted to flicking switches in the control center and observing how the rocket responded.

== Flight ==
At 12:30 p.m. EST on October 27, 1961, the RP-1 propellant started to flow into the rocket. A slight surplus (3%) of the fuel required was put into the rocket, as it was possible to easily drain fuel. Just before launch, surplus fuel was removed from the tanks.

Liquid oxygen began flowing into its tanks at 3:00 a.m. the next day. It followed the same procedure as the RP-1 with the tanks being filled to 10 percent to check for leaks, then fast filled to 97 percent, then slowly topped off.

Despite a couple of delays due to bad weather, the rocket was launched only one hour behind schedule. The engineers had given the rocket only a 75 percent chance of lifting off and only a 30 percent chance of completing a nominal flight. Even with a nominal flight some damage was thought possible. At the Redstone Arsenal, ground testing had shattered windows 12 km away.

The sound of the launch was a disappointment for some witnesses, being described as like an Atlas rocket launch, when observers stood 1.5 miles (2.4 km) away instead of three miles (5 km) for a Saturn launch. It was later determined that the cause of the difference between the Cape and the Redstone Arsenal was atmospheric conditions damping the sound.

"Ignition. All engines running. Launch commit, launch commit! Liftoff! (shouting) Go, go, go, go! Go man! Go! "

The flight itself was nearly perfect. The rocket reached a height of 136.5 km and impacted 345.7 km down range from the launch site in the Atlantic Ocean. The only real problem was the rocket cut off 1.6 seconds ahead of schedule. This was traced to the fact that there was 400 kg too much liquid oxygen and 410 kg too little RP-1. For the test flight, SA-1 only carried a propellant load that was 83 percent full.
