= Saturn I SA-4 =

March 1963 Apollo program test launch

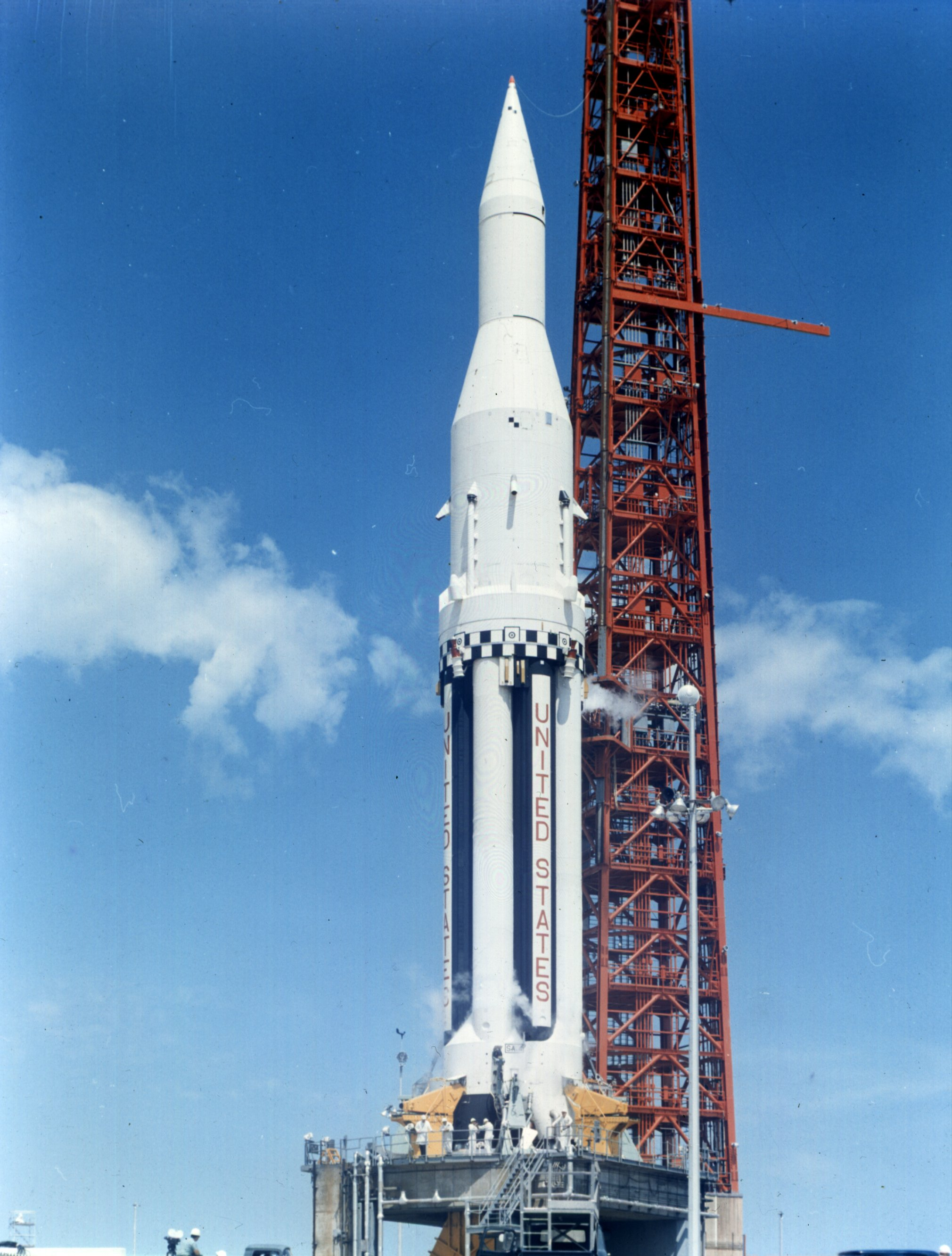
- SA-4 on Pad 34
- Mission type: Test flight
- Operator: NASA
- Mission duration: 15 minutes
- Distance travelled: 400 kilometers (250 mi)
- Apogee: 129 kilometers (80 mi)

Spacecraft properties
- Launch mass: 52,480 kilograms (115,700 lb)

Start of mission
- Launch date: March 28, 1963, 20:11:55 UTC
- Rocket: Saturn I
- Launch site: Cape Canaveral LC-34

End of mission
- Decay date: March 28, 1963, 20:26:55 UTC

Saturn-Apollo 4 (SA-4) was the fourth launch of a Saturn I launch vehicle and the last of the initial test phase of the first stage. It was part of the Apollo Program.

== Objectives ==
SA-4 was the last flight to test only the S-I first stage of the Saturn I rocket. As with the first three launches this would be a suborbital flight and would test the structural integrity of the rocket.

The major addition to this flight was that, in order to test the rocket's ability to deal with an engine failure during the flight, one of the engines would be programmed to shut down about 100 seconds after launch. If all went well the rocket would reroute the fuel for this engine to the other engines and have the rocket burn longer to compensate for the loss of acceleration. This was used successfully on the later Apollo 6 and Apollo 13 flights (both Saturn V rockets).

Also on this flight, the dummy second stage was outfitted with the aerodynamic design of the real second stage. This included vent ducts, fairings and dummy camera pods. The rocket also flew with antennae designed for the Block II version of the rocket.

== Flight ==
After the shortest checkout time of any rocket at 54 days, SA-4 went on to experience the longest series of holds of any mission at 102 minutes. The SA-4 launch would be the final single-stage flight.

The rocket operated perfectly through the first 100 seconds of the flight, when the No. 5 engine shut off as planned. The rocket then continued to operate properly, the propellant system rerouting the fuel to the other engines. The No. 5 engine did not disintegrate because of heat caused by the lack of cooling propellant as some had predicted. This was an important test proving an important feature of the clustered engine design.

The rocket reached a maximum height of 129 km and a peak velocity of 5906 km per hour. At this stage it also fired retrorockets that would be used on later missions to separate the rocket stages. On SA-4 the stages were not designed to separate but tested the retrorockets to make sure they would fire.

== Additional Sources ==
Results of the Fourth Saturn I Launch Vehicle Test Flight - SA-4 - MPR-SAT-63-6 - May 10, 1963
