= Saturn I SA-3 =

Third flight of the Saturn I

Saturn-Apollo 3
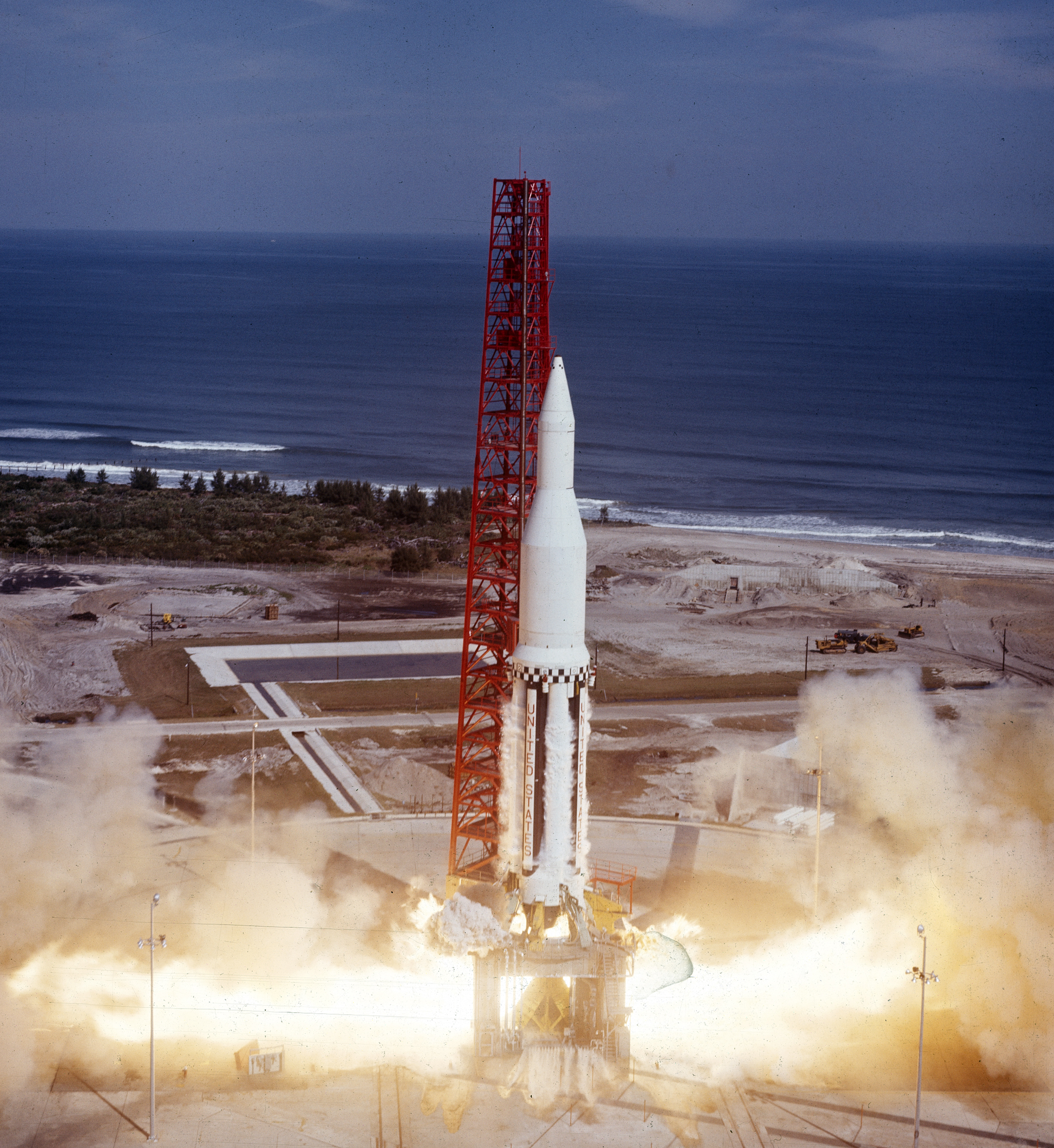
- SA-3 at liftoff from Pad 34
- Mission type: Test flight
- Operator: NASA
- Mission duration: 4 minutes, 52 seconds
- Distance travelled: 211.41 km (131.36 mi)
- Apogee: 167.22 km (103.91 mi)

Spacecraft properties
- Launch mass: 499,683 kg (550.8 short tons)

Start of mission
- Launch date: November 16, 1962, 17:45:02 UTC
- Rocket: Saturn I SA-3
- Launch site: Cape Canaveral LC-34

End of mission
- Destroyed: November 16, 1962, 17:49:54 UTC (Project Highwater)

Saturn-Apollo 3 (SA-3) was the third flight of the Saturn I launch vehicle, the second flight of Project Highwater, and part of the American Apollo program. The rocket was launched on November 16, 1962, from Cape Canaveral, Florida.

== History ==
The Saturn I launch vehicle components were delivered to Cape Canaveral by the barge Promise on September 19, 1962, but erection of the first-stage booster onto its launch pedestal was delayed until September 21 due to a tropical depression that moved over the Florida peninsula. The dummy second and third stages (S-IV and S-V) and payload were assembled on the booster on September 24. Ballast water was loaded into the dummy stages on October 31, and the RP-1 fuel was loaded on November 14.

For this launch, Cape Canaveral director Kurt Debus asked Marshall Space Flight Center director Wernher von Braun, who was overseeing the Saturn project, that no outside visitors be allowed on NASA grounds due to the ongoing tensions of the Cuban Missile Crisis.

== Flight ==
Saturn-Apollo 3 was launched at 17:45:02 on November 16, 1962, from Launch Complex 34. The only hold in the countdown sequence was for 45 minutes due to a power failure in ground support equipment. This mission was the first time the Saturn I rocket was launched with a full load of propellant, carrying approximately 750,000 pounds (340,000 kg) of fuel.

The vehicle's four inner H-1 engines shut down at 2 minutes 21.66 seconds after launch and an altitude of 38.19 miles (61.46 km), and its four outer engines shut down at 2 minutes 29.09 seconds and 44.19 miles (71.11 km); both sets burned slightly longer than was initially estimated, reaching a maximum velocity of 4,046 miles per hour (6,511 km/h). The vehicle continued to coast to an altitude of 103.91 miles (167.22 km) and range of 131.36 miles (211.41 km), at which point, 4 minutes 52 seconds after launch, officials sent a terminate command to the rocket, setting off several charges which caused the dummy stages of the vehicle to destruct. The first stage remained intact, though uncontrolled, until it impacted the Atlantic Ocean around 270 miles (430 km) from its launch site.

== Objectives ==
=== Primary ===
The main objectives of SA-3 were much the same as the previous two Saturn I flights in that it was primarily a test of the first-stage booster (S-I) and its H-1 engines. According to the NASA report Results of the Third Saturn 1 Launch Vehicle Test Flight, SA-3 aimed to test four areas: the booster, the ground support equipment, the vehicle in flight, and Project Highwater.

The test of the booster involved the propulsion system, structural design, and control systems. The ground support test involved the facilities and equipment used in the launch, including propellant systems, automatic checkout equipment, launch platform, and support towers. The vehicle in flight test measured aeroballistics, which confirmed values of aerodynamic characteristics such as stability and performance; propulsion, which ensured the engines could provide enough thrust to propel the vehicle at the correct velocity and trajectory, as well as provide data on the performance of all eight engines during flight; structural and mechanical, which provided measurements of the vehicle's stress and vibration levels through all phases of flight; and guidance and control, which demonstrated that spacecraft systems could accurately provide orientation and velocity information.

The fourth objective, Project Highwater, was an experiment previously flown on SA-2. This involved the intentional release of ballast water from the second and third stages which allowed scientists to investigate the nature of Earth's ionosphere, as well as noctilucent clouds and the behavior of ice in space.

For Project Highwater, tanks in SA-3's dummy upper stages were filled with 192,528 pounds (87,329 kg) of water, approximately 22,900 US gallons (87,000 L; 19,100 imp gal), which was used to simulate the mass of future Saturn payloads. The water was divided roughly in half between the two dummy stages. When the terminate command was sent to the rocket, primacord charges split both stages longitudinally, instantly releasing its load of water. The experiment was tracked by cameras and other equipment on the ground and in aircraft. Observers at Cape Canaveral reported that the ice cloud was visible for about three seconds and was "several miles across".

NASA declared all engineering goals of the flight as achieved, despite occasional issues with telemetry during flight and some measurement data being unusable or only partially usable. Project Highwater on SA-3 was also declared successful, though again, telemetry issues produced questionable results.

=== Special ===
The NASA Results report states that ten special tests were included in the SA-3 flight, all focused on technologies and procedures intended for use on future Apollo missions.

Propulsion

As mentioned earlier, SA-3 was the first Apollo flight to carry a full load of propellant, compared to earlier flights that carried approximately 83% of maximum capacity. This had the effect of testing the rocket's reaction to slower acceleration and extended first stage flight time. Also on this mission, the outboard engines were allowed to fire until depletion of the rocket's liquid oxygen (LOX), rather than the timed cut-offs of previous flights.

SA-3 also featured the first use of retrorockets on Apollo hardware. These were the only functional part on SA-3 of what would become the S-I/S-IV stage separation system, which would separate the two stages in later missions. These four small solid rockets were located 90 degrees apart around the top of the S-I stage, with their nozzles aimed up. At 2 minutes 33.66 seconds after launch, the rockets fired for about 2.1 seconds. A minor misalignment of the rockets caused a 4.3 degree per second roll of the vehicle, which caused the spacecraft's ST-90 and ST-124P inertial platforms to fail after 15 degrees of rotation. This was considered incidental to the flight and did not impact mission success.

Instrumentation

The ST-124P inertial platform ('P' for prototype) was a component of the guidance and control system, and contained gyroscopes and accelerometers that fed information to control computers. Once out of the atmosphere, this information provided steering signals to the gimbaled engines. During SA-3, this platform was an inactive component; while functioning and monitored during the flight, it had no control over the vehicle, and was used only to compare performance with the then-standard ST-90 platform, which was also an inactive component for the flight. For this mission, both platforms were located on the interstage between S-I and S-IV; Saturn IB and Saturn V vehicles would have one on the Instrument Unit atop the S-IVB stage.

Two new transmitters were included on SA-3. The pulse code modulated (PCM) data link transmitted digital data, which would be vital to providing automated spacecraft checkout and launch procedures on future flights. The unit operated with high signal strength, indicating that it would provide very accurate data. An ultra high frequency (UHF) radio link was also tested on SA-3. It would be used to transmit sensor measurements which could not be effectively transmitted at lower frequencies. The system performed satisfactorily, and post-flight documentation indicated engineers may expand its role for future telemetry transmission.

A Block II antenna panel was tested during flight. Located between propellant tanks, it provided stronger and more consistent signal strength than the Block I panel.

Temperature measurements of the S-IV dummy stage and interstage fairing were carried out with eighteen temperature probes, called thermocouples. These were used to detect temperature changes around protuberances on the stage's skin and in the area of the retrorockets during operation. For the S-IV stage, temperatures were within expected levels, though a heating rate around twice that predicted was encountered. On the interstage, during retrorocket firing, a maximum temperature of 315 °C (599 °F) was seen, indicating something unknown may have caused an abnormally high reading.

Engineering and ground equipment

A single panel of Block II M-31 heat shield insulation, along with one of the spacecraft's calorimeters, was mounted on the base of the first stage by the engines. This test measured heat flux through the new insulation compared to the material normally used on Saturn I Block I flights.

A dynamic pressure study was conducted for the Centaur program, in which two aluminum panels were mounted to the payload adapter atop the S-V stage and equipped with 11 pressure sensors. This study was performed due to the failure of the first Centaur vehicle flown, suspected to result from an adverse pressure environment around the shoulder of the vehicle. The test found that a very low pressure region formed just behind the shoulder while the vehicle was at Mach 0.7.

Finally, a new 240-foot (73 m) umbilical tower and Block II swing arm were used for the first time in preparation for future Block II Saturn I flights.
