= Cape Canaveral Launch Complex 34 =

Launch site at Cape Canaveral Space Force Station

Launch Complex 34
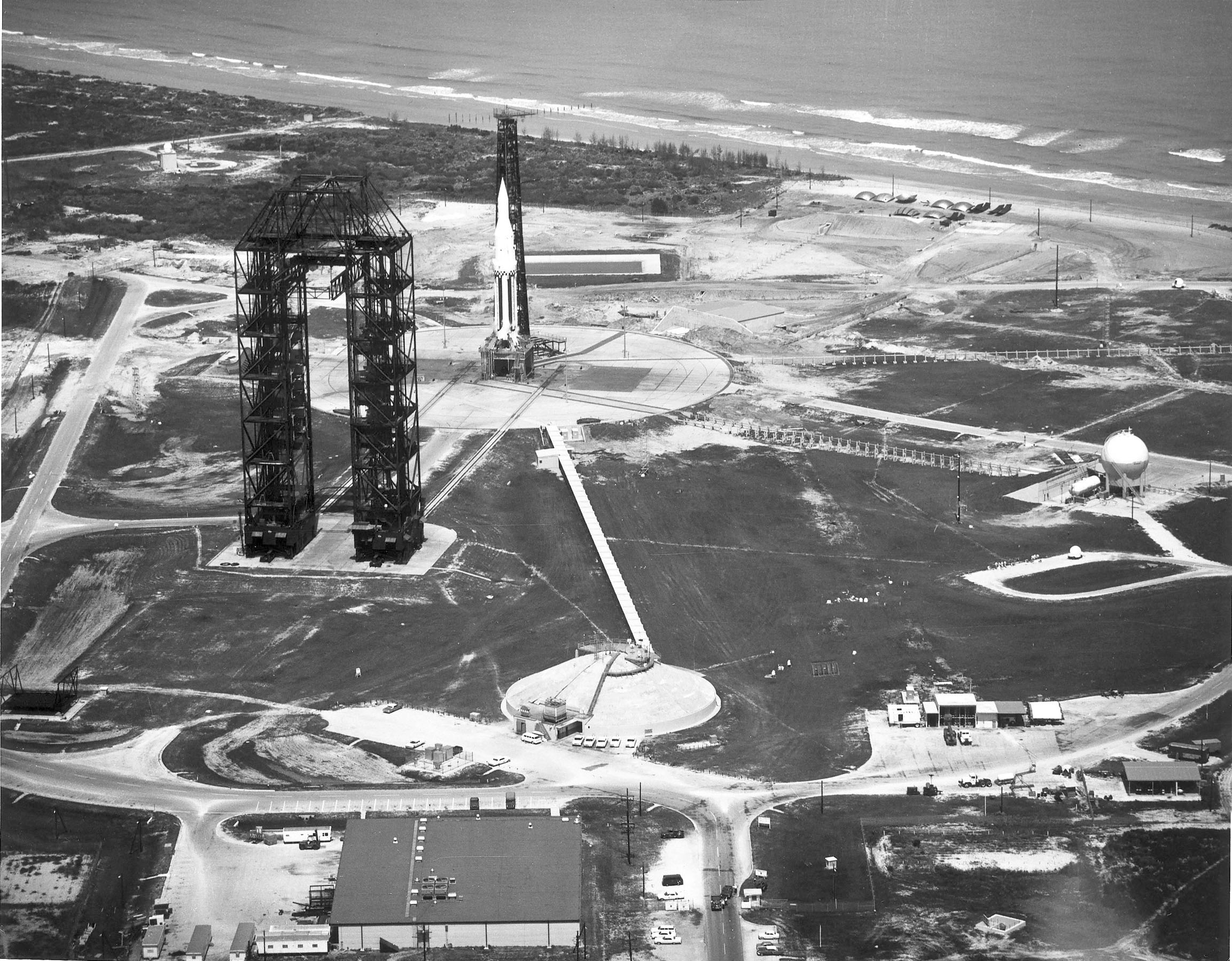
- LC-34 with Saturn I rocket SA-4 on 28 March 1963
- Interactive map of Launch Complex 34
- Launch site: Cape Canaveral Space Force Station
- Location: 28°31′19″N 80°33′41″W
- Time zone: UTC−05:00 (EST)
  - Summer (DST): UTC−04:00 (EDT)
- Short name: LC-34
- Operator: United States Space Force
- Total launches: 7
- Launch pad: 1
- Orbital inclination range: 28° - 57°
Launch history
- Status: Inactive
- First launch: October 27, 1961; Saturn I (SA-1)
- Last launch: October 11, 1968; Saturn IB (Apollo 7)
- Associated rockets: Saturn I Saturn IB

Launch Complex 34 (LC-34) is a deactivated launch site on Cape Canaveral Space Force Station, Florida. LC-34 and its companion LC-37 to the north were used by NASA from 1961 through 1968 to launch Saturn I and IB rockets as part of the Apollo program. It is the site of the Apollo 1 fire, which claimed the lives of astronauts Gus Grissom, Ed White, and Roger Chaffee on January 27, 1967. The first crewed Apollo launch, Apollo 7 on October 11, 1968, is the last time LC-34 was used.

== History ==
=== Construction ===
Work began on LC-34 in 1960, and it was formally dedicated on June 5, 1961. The complex consisted of a launch platform, umbilical tower, mobile service tower, fueling facilities, and a blockhouse. Two steel flame deflectors were mounted on rails to allow placement beneath the launch platform. The service tower was likewise mounted on rails, and it was moved to a position 185 meters west of the pad before launch. At 95 meters high, it was the tallest structure at LC-34.

The blockhouse, located 320 meters from the pad, was modeled after the domed reinforced concrete structure at LC-20. During a launch, it could accommodate 130 people as well as test and instrumentation equipment. Periscopes afforded views outside the windowless facility.

=== Saturn I and IB ===
LC-34 saw its first launch on October 27, 1961. The first Saturn I, Block I, mission SA-1, lofted a dummy upper stage on a suborbital trajectory into the Atlantic. The subsequent three Saturn I launches took place at LC-34, ending with SA-4 on March 28, 1963. The six ensuing Saturn I, Block II launches were conducted at LC-37.

LC-34 was extensively modified to support Saturn IB launches, which began in February 1966. New anchor points were built to fasten the service structure in place during high winds. Access arms on the umbilical tower were rebuilt to match the larger rocket. At the 67-meter level, the swing arm was outfitted with a white room to permit access to the command module at the top of a rocket.

Two Saturn IBs (AS-201 and AS-202) were successfully launched from LC-34 before the Apollo 1 fire brought Apollo activities at the spaceport to an abrupt halt. After the fire, extinguishing equipment was installed at the top of the umbilical tower, and a slide wire was set up to provide astronauts a quick escape in the event of an emergency.

The first crewed Apollo launch, Apollo 7 on October 11, 1968, was the most recent time LC-34 was used. NASA considered reactivating both LC-34 and Launch Complex 37 for the Apollo Applications Program, but instead LC-39B was modified to launch Saturn IBs.

=== Inactivity ===
After the decommissioning of LC-34, the umbilical tower and service structure were razed, leaving only the launch platform standing at the center of the pad, as well as the two flame deflectors and the blockhouse. The original spherical Liquid Oxygen (LOX) tank also stood at the pad until 2008, when it was purchased by SpaceX and relocated to Space Launch Complex 40 (SLC-40) for use in Falcon 9 flights.

Currently, LC-34 is not tenanted by anybody and is primarily used as a memorial for Apollo 1. However, the United States Space Force has entertained leasing the pad to a commercial customer on account of its relatively large size and Cape Canaveral's limited real estate. Additionally, any precedent of a memorialized launch site refraining from getting a tenant was broken in 2023, when the Space Force awarded the lease for Launch Complex 14 (which has been similarly used to honor the Mercury Seven) to Stoke Space for use in Nova flights.

== Apollo 1 memorial ==
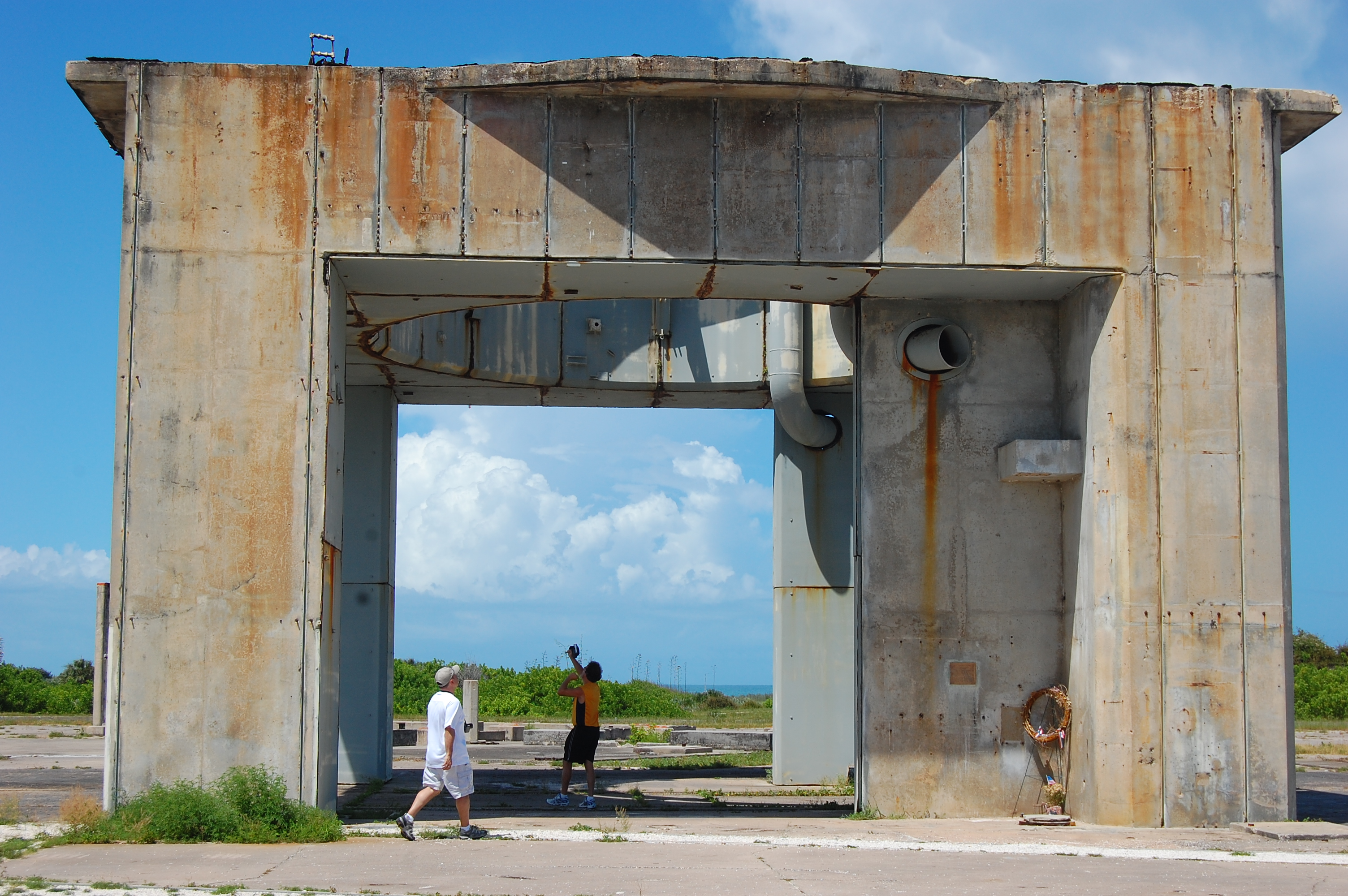
LC-34 today. The plaque (below) is on the rear of the right column. Today the pad is fenced off, preventing visitors from walking beneath the pad or getting close enough to read the memorial plaques.

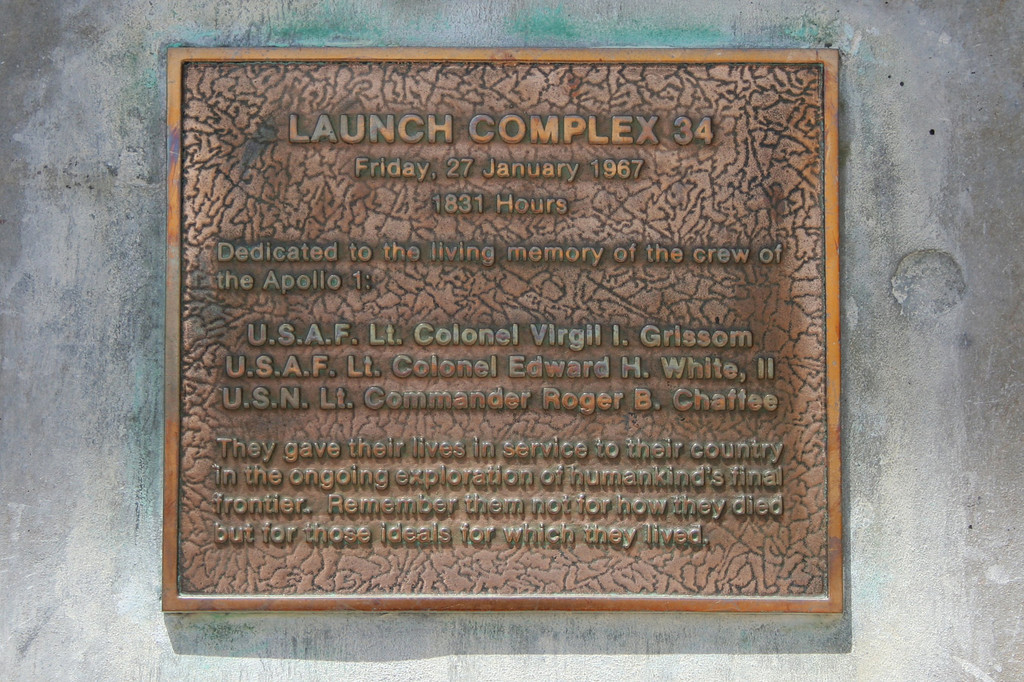
Apollo 1 plaque at LC-34

Following Apollo 7's flight, the remaining parts of LC-34 like the launch platform serve as a memorial to the crew of Apollo 1. A dedicatory plaque affixed to the structure bears the inscription:

LAUNCH COMPLEX 34
Friday, 27 January 1967
1831 Hours

Dedicated to the living memory of the crew of the Apollo 1

U.S.A.F. Lt. Colonel Virgil I. Grissom
U.S.A.F. Lt. Colonel Edward H. White, II
U.S.N. Lt. Commander Roger B. Chaffee

They gave their lives in service to their country in the ongoing exploration of humankind's final frontier. Remember them not for how they died but for those ideals for which they lived.

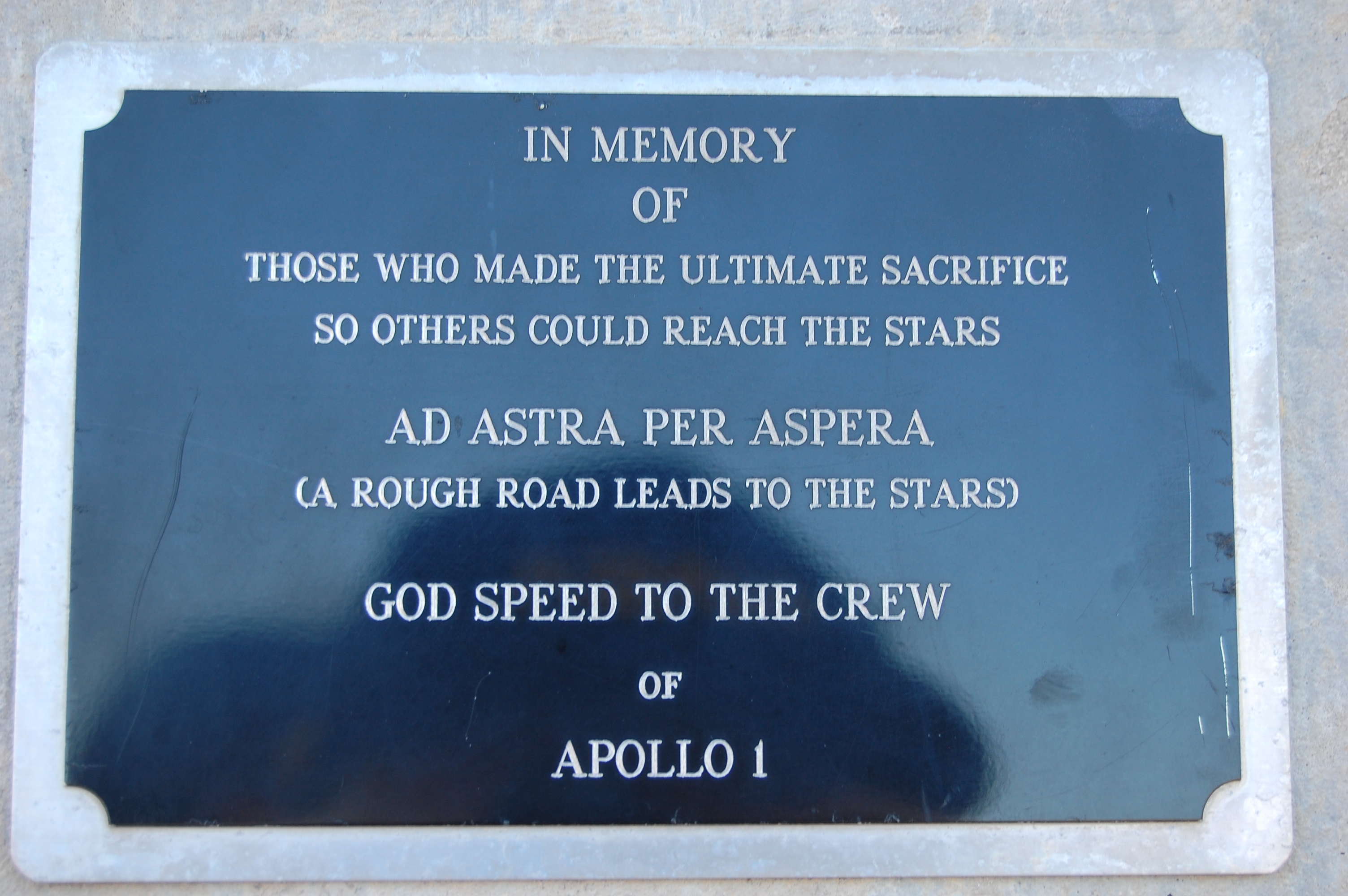
Small plaque on side of the right rear column

Another plaque (which was shown in the film Armageddon) reads:

IN MEMORY
OF
THOSE WHO MADE THE ULTIMATE SACRIFICE
SO OTHERS COULD REACH THE STARS

AD ASTRA PER ASPERA
(A ROUGH ROAD LEADS TO THE STARS)

GOD SPEED TO THE CREW
OF
APOLLO 1

=== Gallery ===
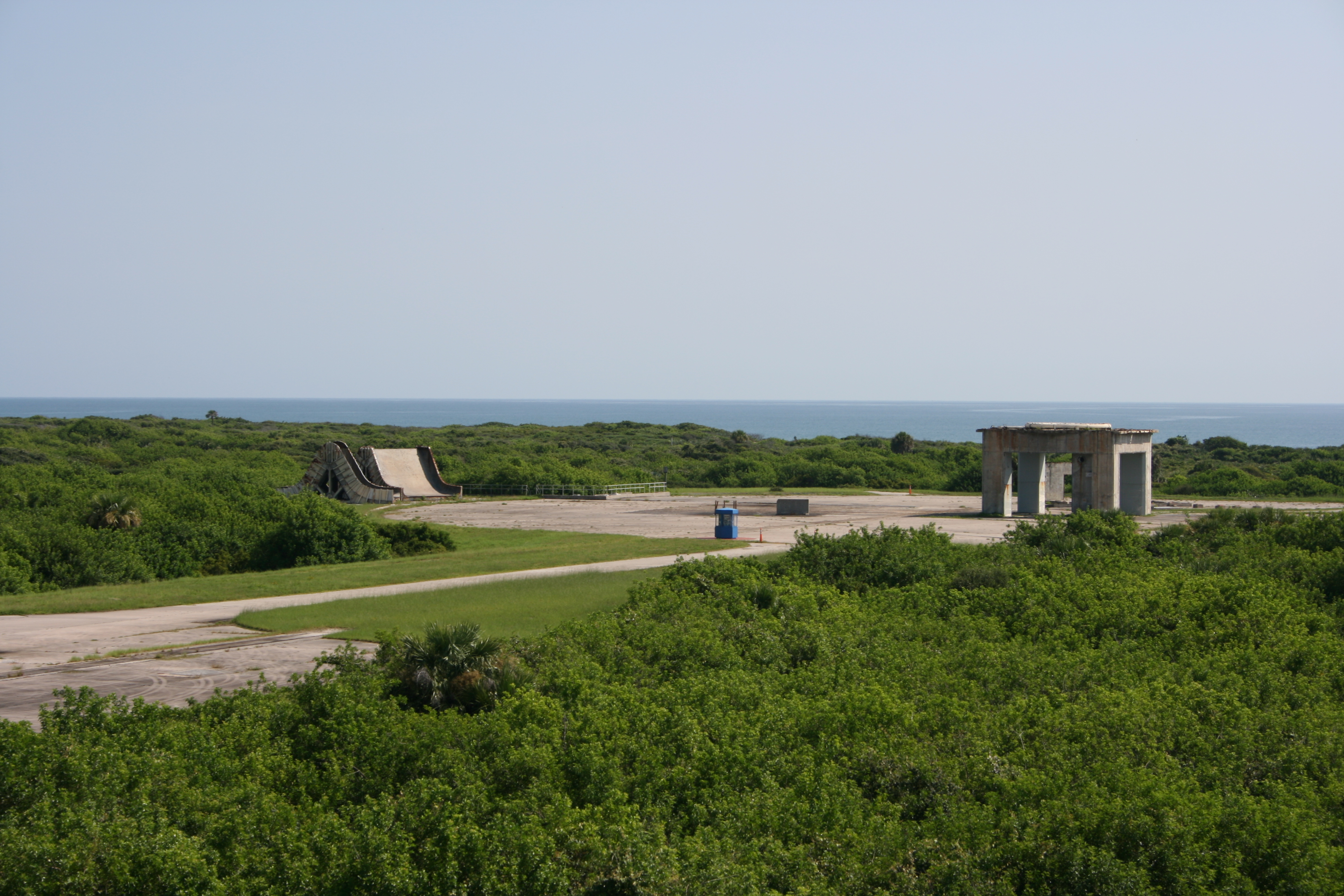
Pad 34 after being turned into a memorial site

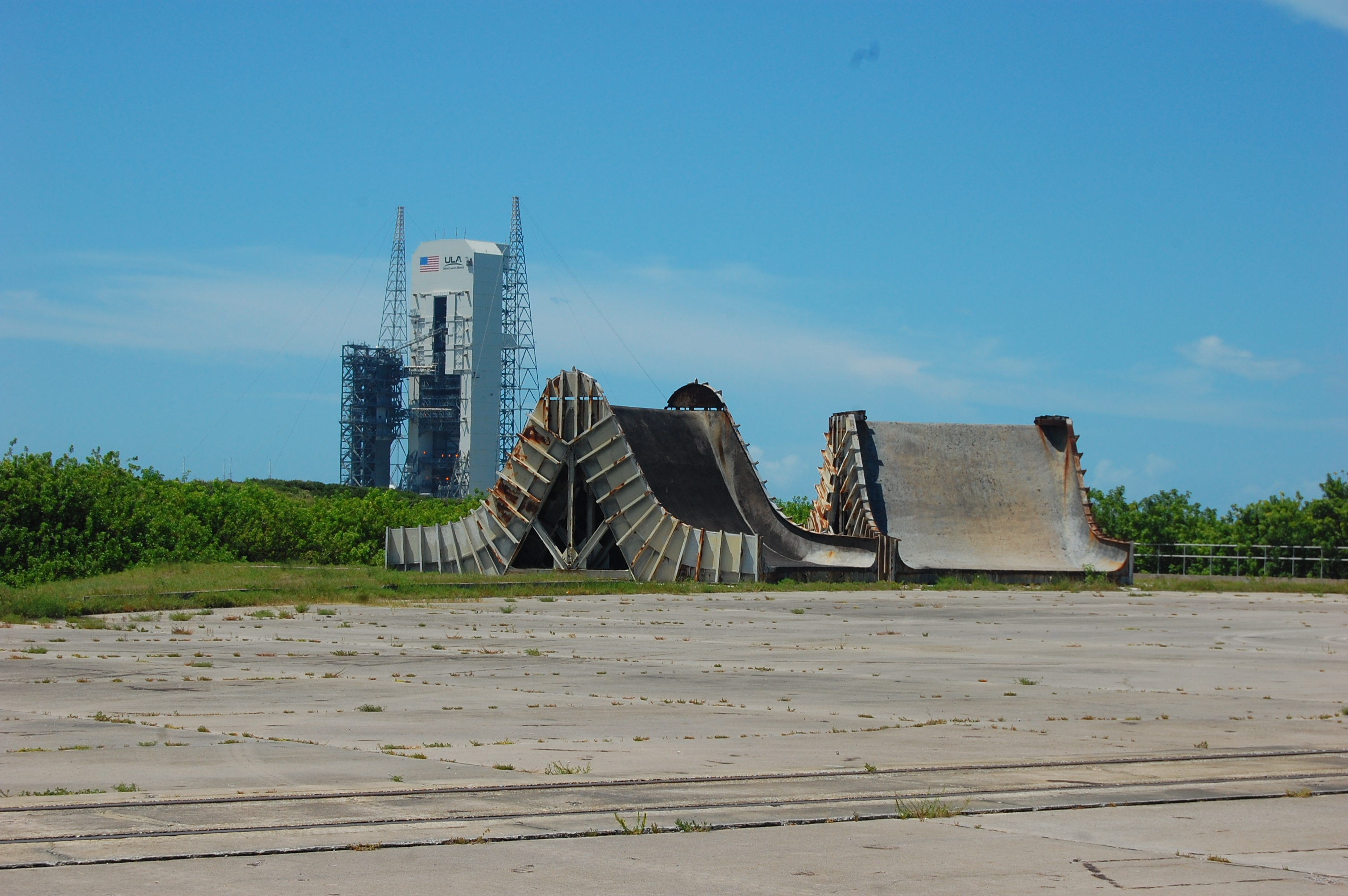
Saturn I and IB flame deflectors. Pad 37 is in the background.

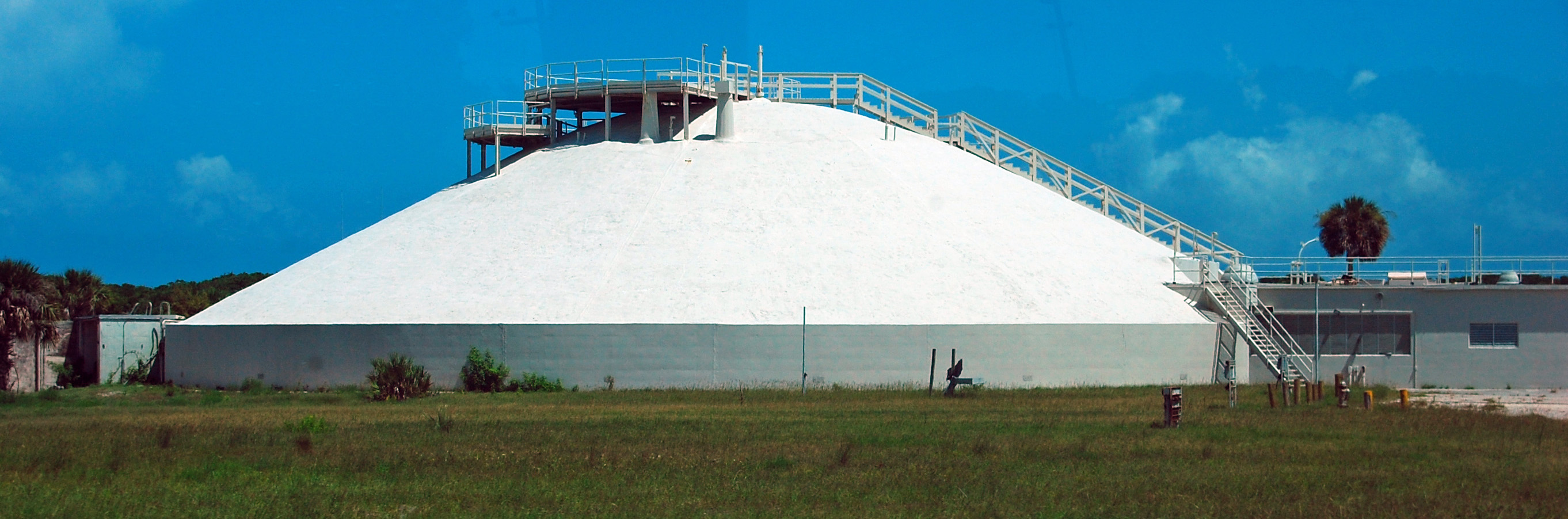
Blockhouse

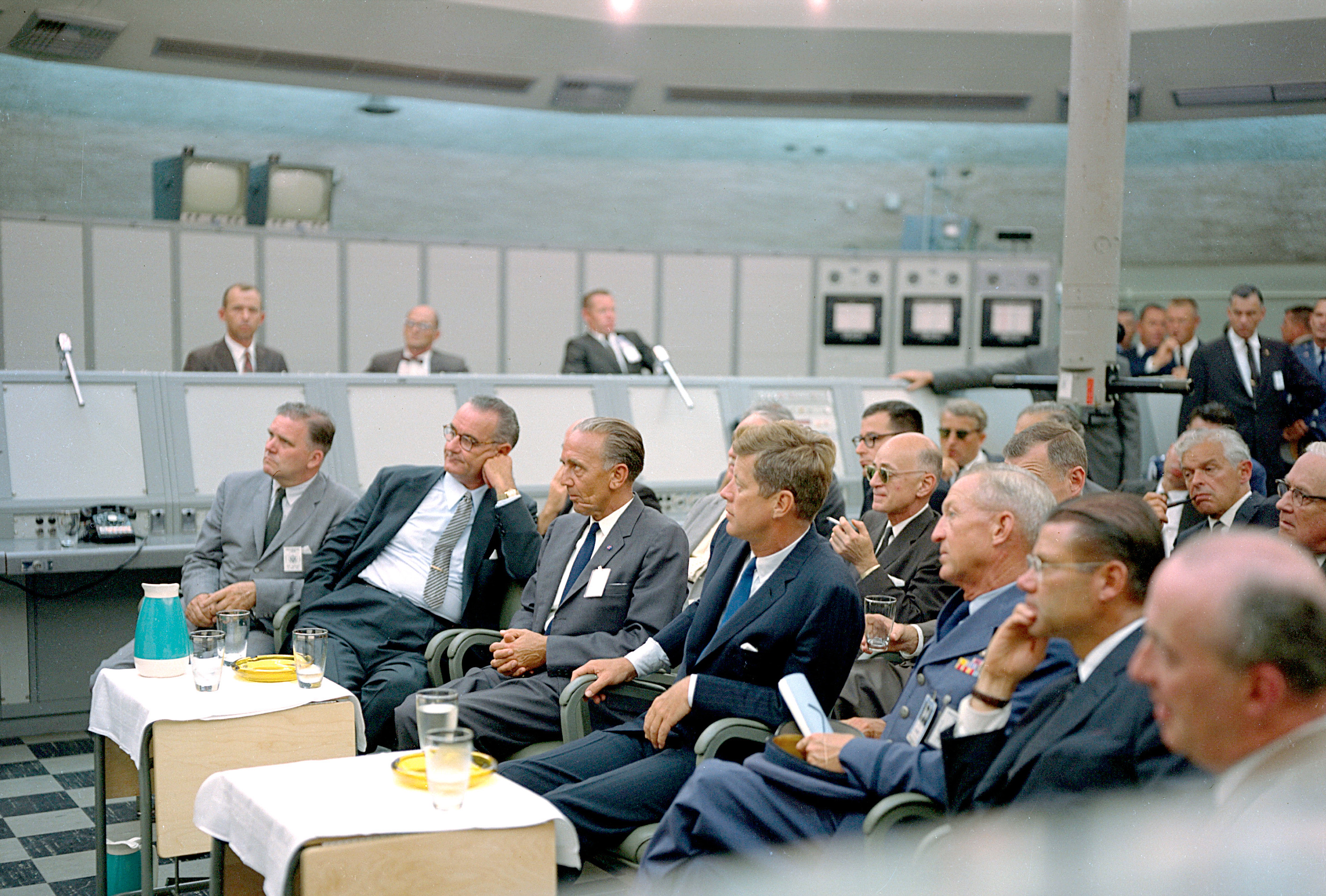
NASA administrator James Webb, VP Johnson and President Kennedy are briefed during a tour of Blockhouse 34 in 1962

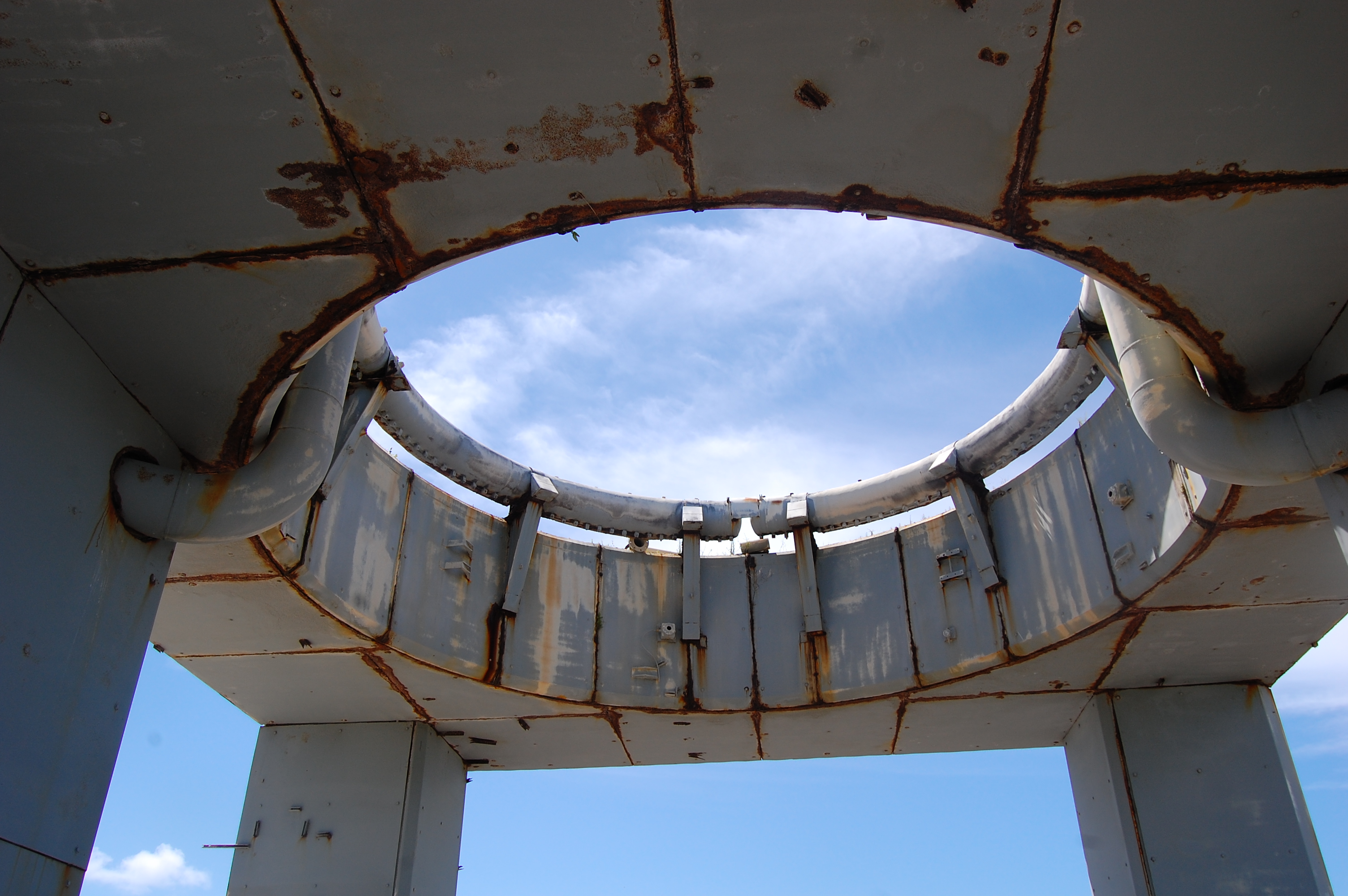
Underside

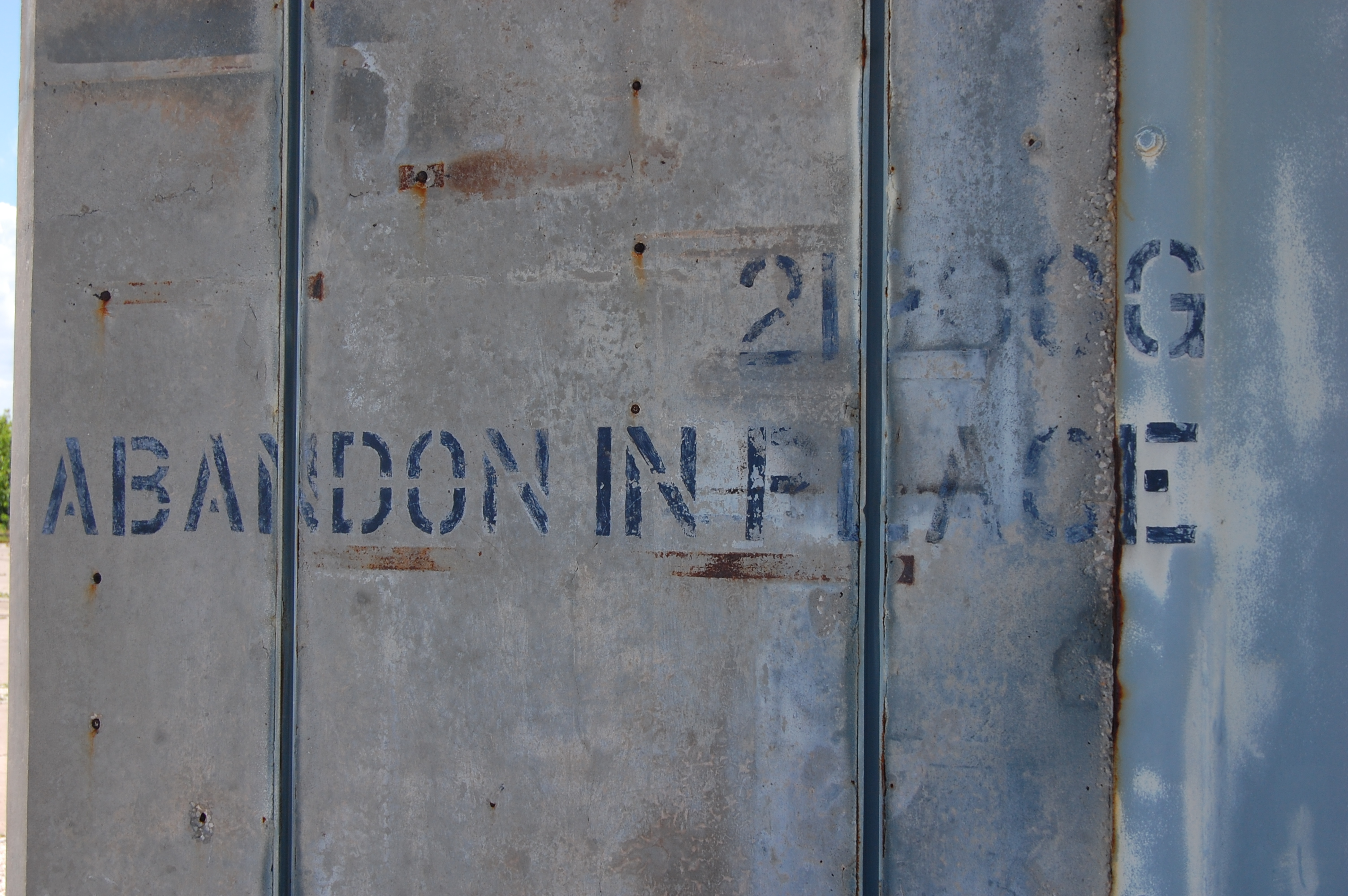
"Abandon in place", which means to abandon it "as is", with no maintenance. Most of the historical launch sites at Cape Canaveral are categorized in this manner.

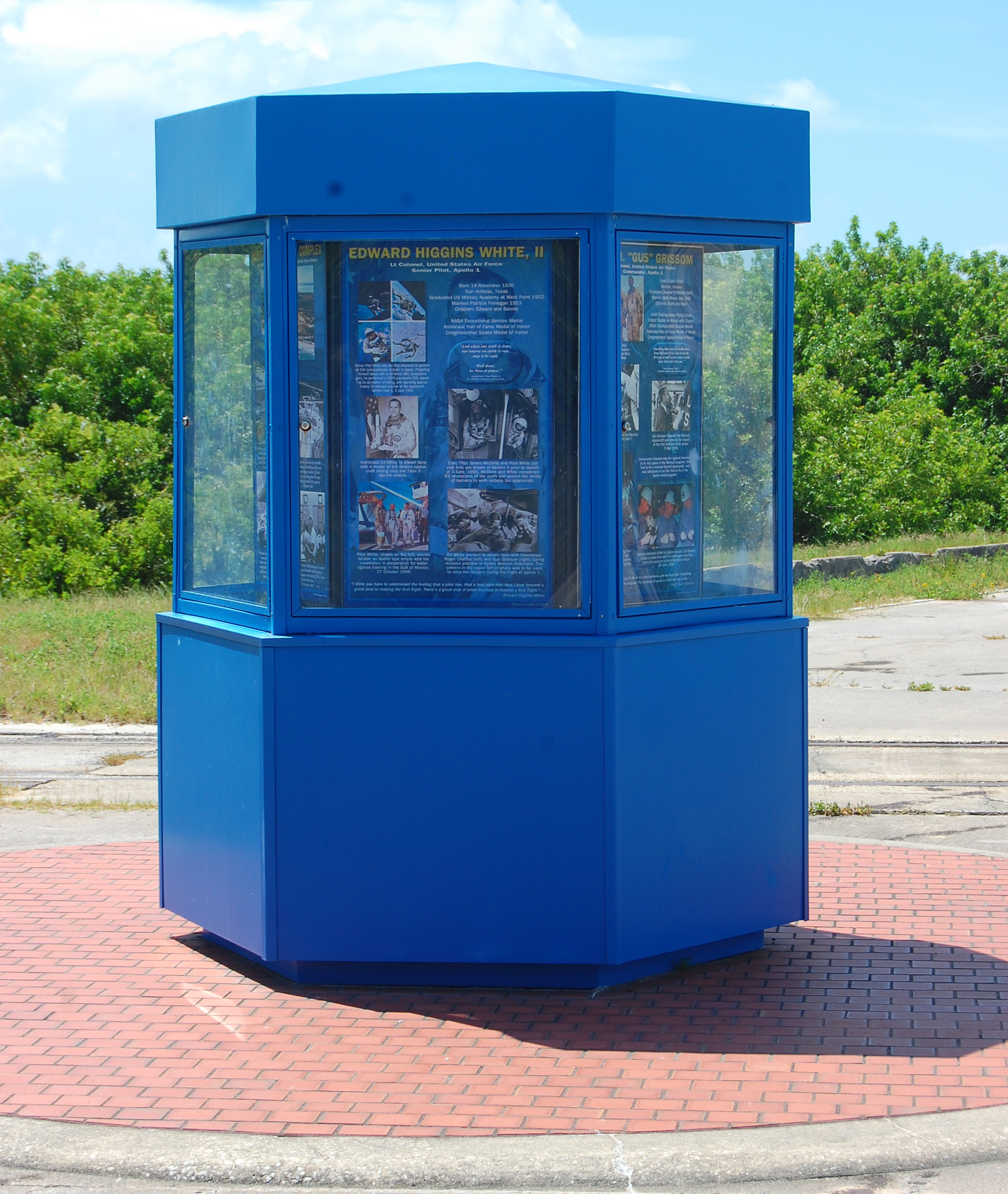
Astronaut memorial kiosk

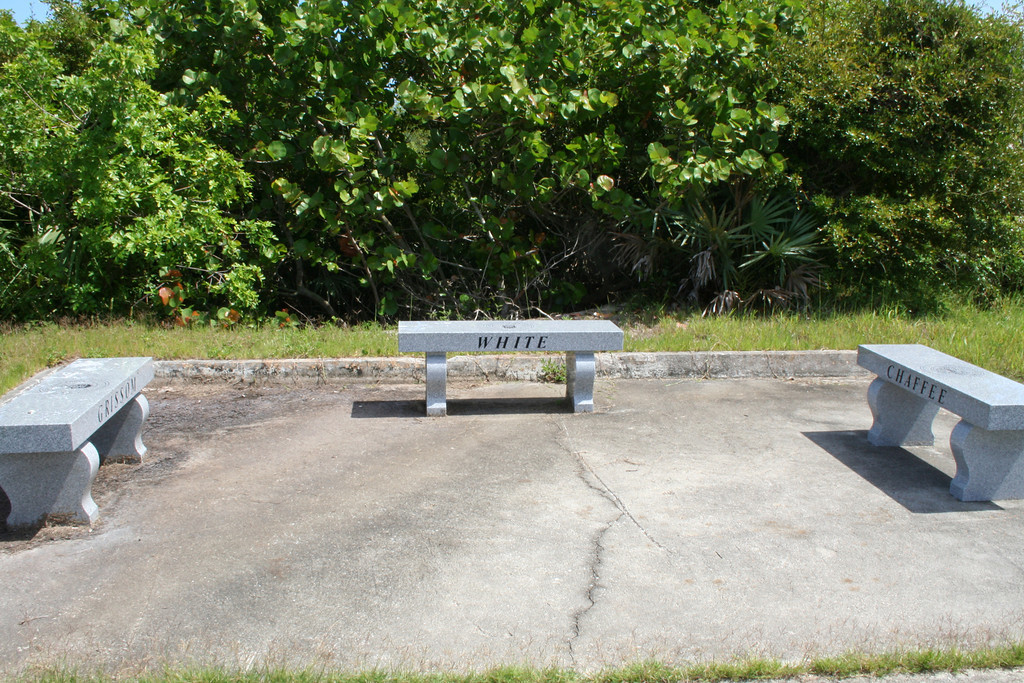
Granite memorial benches on the southern edge of the launch pad

== Launch statistics ==
Launch sites at Cape Canaveral Space Force Station and Kennedy Space Center
Active pads
Repurposed pads, not used for launches
Inactive leased pads
Inactive unleased pads
1 LC-39B
2 LC-39A
3 LC-48
4 SLC-41
5 SLC-40
6 LC-47
7 SLC-37
8 LC-34
9 SLC-20
10 LC-19
11 LC-16
12 LC-15
13 LC-14
14 LC-13 (LZ-2)
15 LC-12
16 LC-11
17 LC-36
18 LC-1, LC-2, LC-3, and LC-4
19 SLC-46
20 LC-21 and LC-22
21 LC-31 and LC-32
22 LC-18
23 SLC-17
24 LC-26
25 LC-5 and LC-6
26 LC-30
27 LC-25
28 LC-29
- Saturn I
- Saturn IB

=== List of launches ===
All flights operated by NASA.

No.	Date	Time (GMT)	Launch vehicle	Serial number	Mission	Result	Remarks
1	27 October 1961	15:06	Saturn I	SA-1	SA-1	Success	Suborbital launch. Maiden flight of the Saturn I and the Saturn family, and first launch from LC-34. Only the S-I was a live stage, with the rest being boilerplates.
2	25 April 1962	14:00	Saturn I	SA-2	SA-2	Success	Suborbital launch. Boilerplate upper stages detonated after completion of mission as part of Project Highwater, done to test effects of water at high altitudes on communications.
3	16 November 1962	17:45	Saturn I	SA-3	SA-3	Success	Suborbital launch. Boilerplate upper stages detonated after completion of mission as part of Project Highwater, done to test effects of water at high altitudes on communications.
4	28 March 1963	20:11	Saturn I	SA-4	SA-4	Success	Suborbital launch. Final Saturn I launch to use a boilerplate second stage.
5	26 February 1966	15:06	Saturn IB	SA-201	AS-201	Success	Suborbital launch. Maiden flight of the Saturn IB and of an operational Apollo CSM. Also occasionally known as Apollo 1-A.
6	25 August 1966	17:15	Saturn IB	SA-202	AS-202	Success	Suborbital launch. Also occasionally known as Apollo 2.
-	Planned for 21 February 1967	Cancelled	Saturn IB	SA-204	Apollo 1	Precluded	Intended to be the first crewed flight of the Apollo Program. Flight precluded a month before launch on January 27, when a fire broke out in the CSM during an on-pad test, killing astronauts Gus Grissom, Ed White, and Roger Chaffee. Planned rocket would be later used for Apollo 5.
7	11 October 1968	15:02	Saturn IB	SA-205	Apollo 7	Success	Test of Apollo CSM for length of planned lunar journey. First crewed Apollo flight, and first crewed American spaceflight following the Apollo 1 fire. Last crewed launch from Cape Canaveral Station until Boeing CFT in 2024. First orbital launch from LC-34, and most recent launch from LC-34.

== Gallery ==
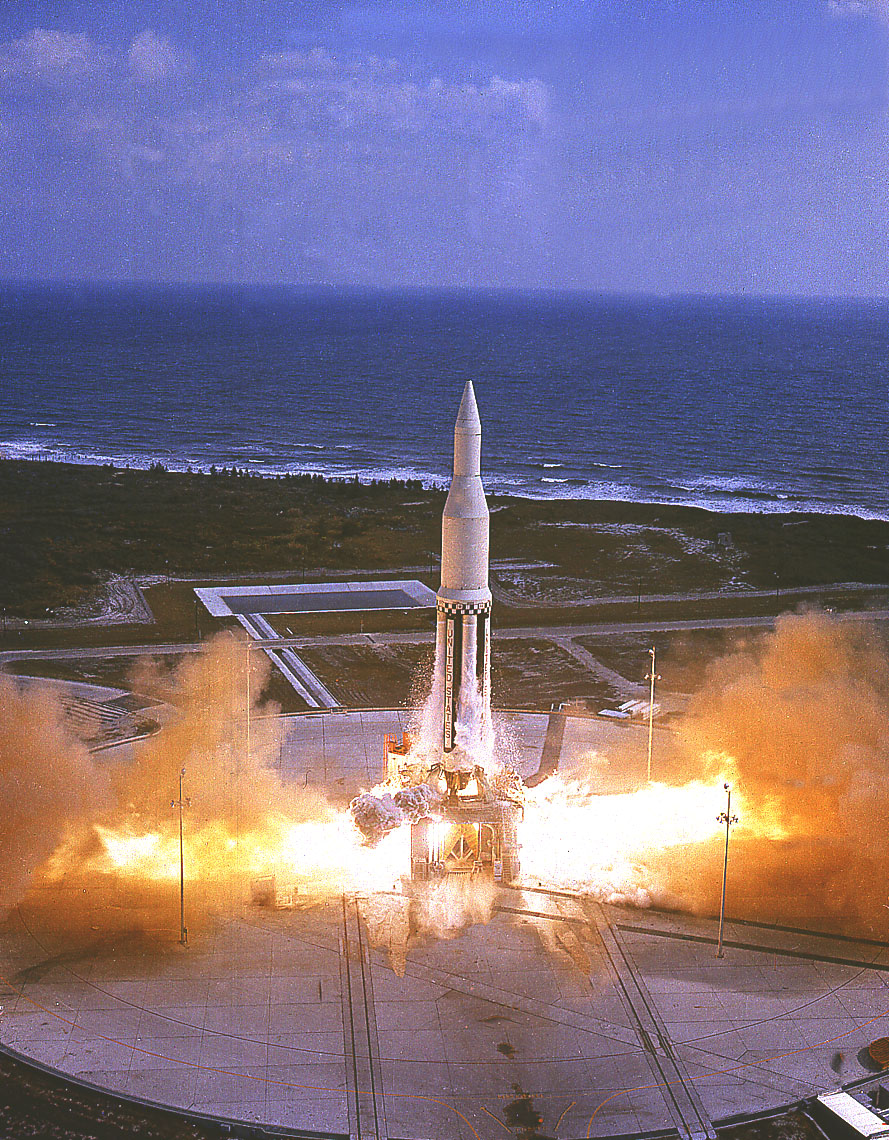
The first launch from LC-34, Saturn SA-1 in October 1961

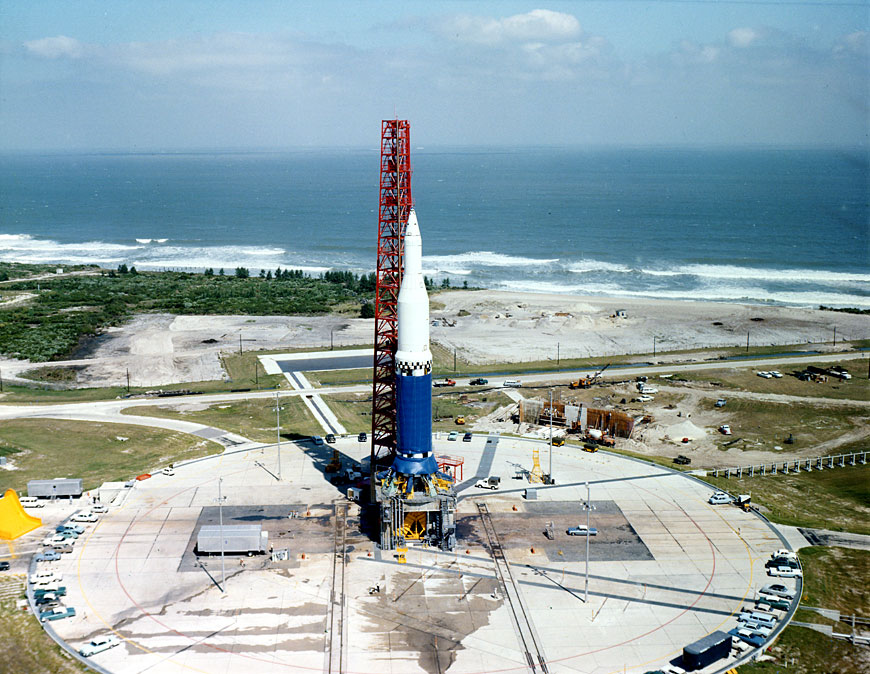
Saturn I for mission SA-3 in place on Pad 34, prior to November 1962 launch

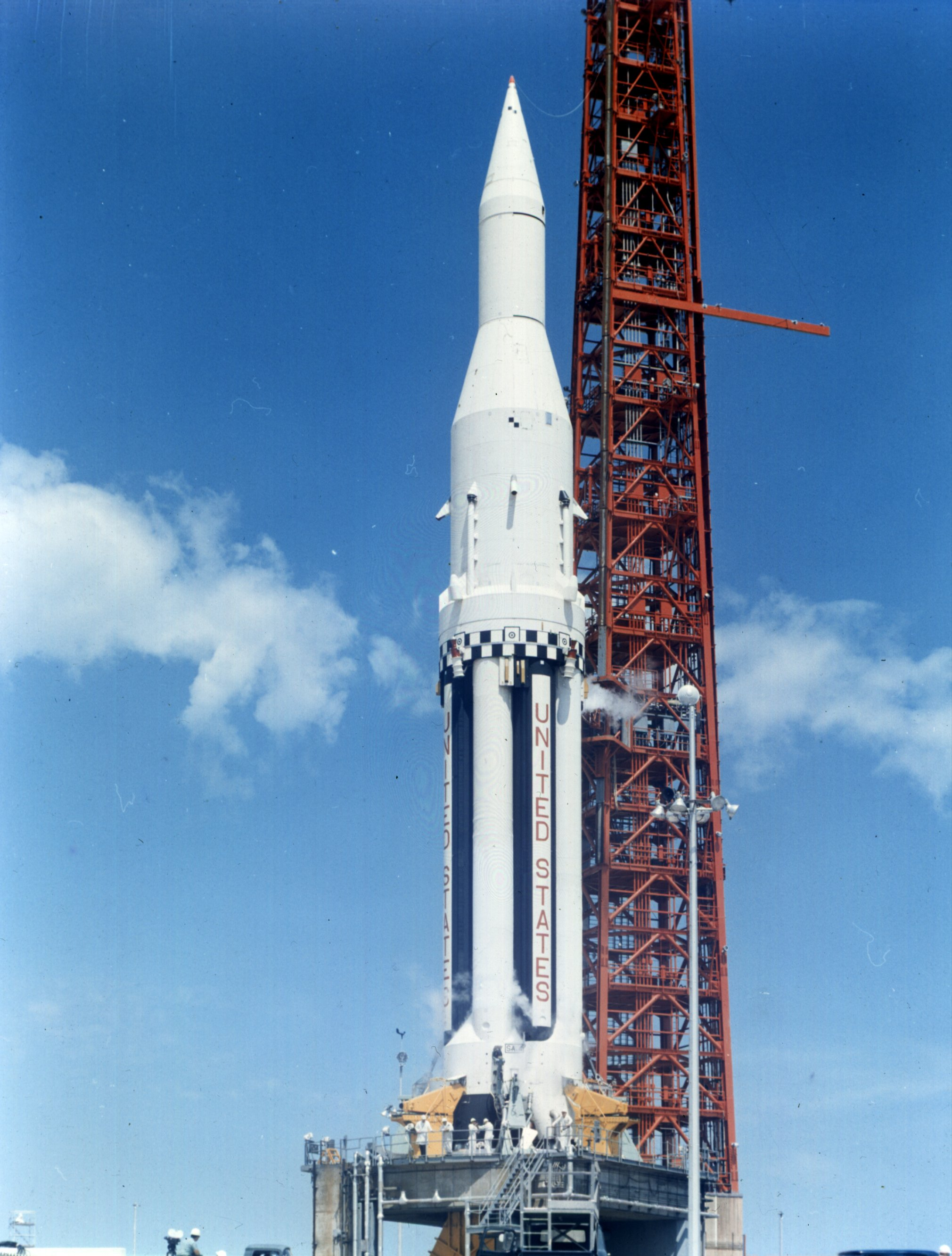
Saturn SA-4 on the pad at LC-34 in March 1963

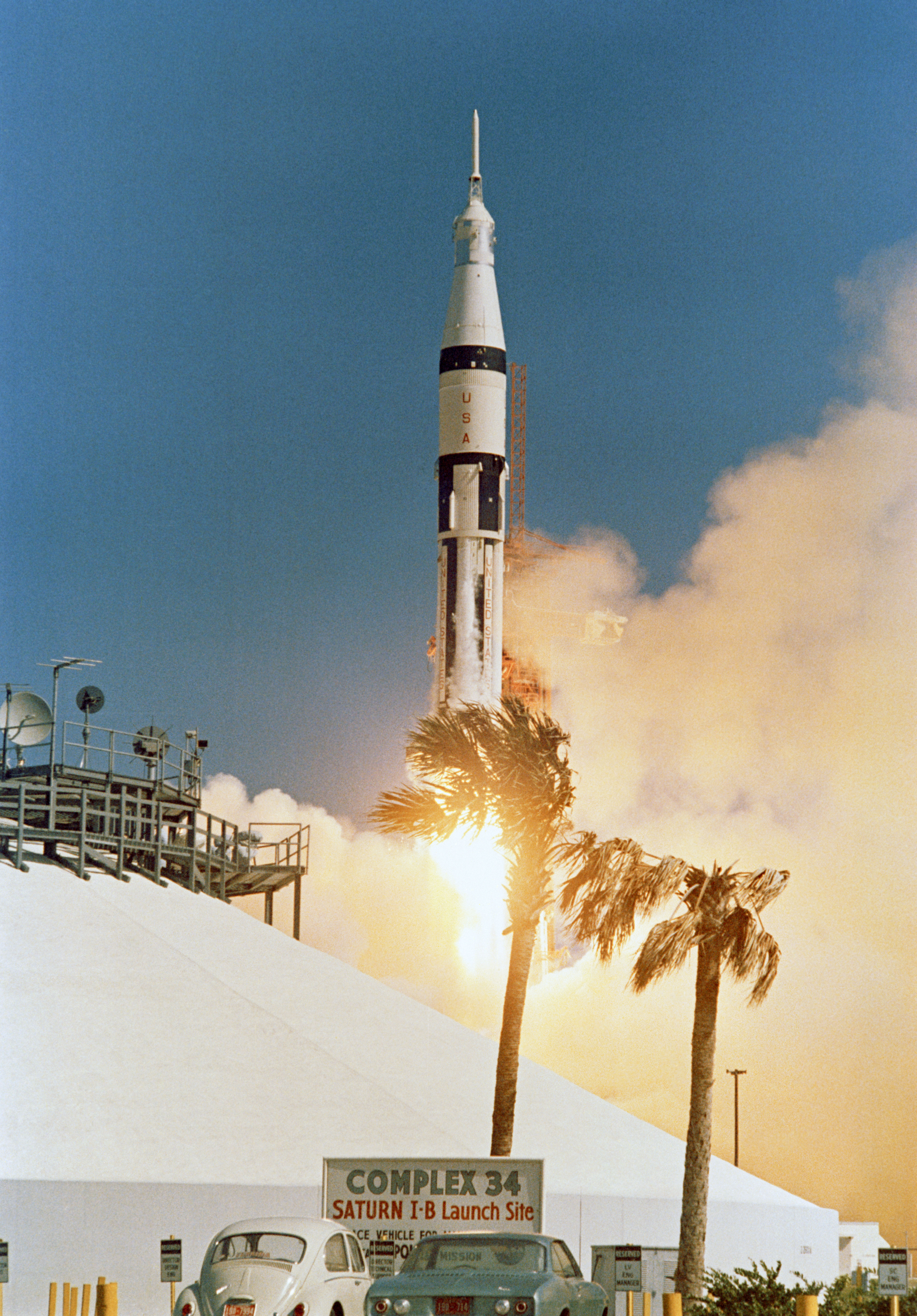
Apollo 7 launch, photographed from behind the blockhouse

== See also ==
- List of spaceflights by year
- List of Cape Canaveral and Merritt Island launch sites
- Project Apollo
- Saturn I
- Saturn IB
- Cape Canaveral Space Launch Complex 37
