= Controlled lab reactor =

In chemistry, a Controlled Lab Reactor or CLR is any reaction system where there is an element of automated control. Generally these devices refers to a jacketed glass vessel where a circulating chiller unit pumps a thermal control fluid through the jacket to accurately control the temperature of the vessel contents. Additional to this, it is common to have a series of sensors (temperature, pH, pressure) measuring and recording parameters about the reactor contents. It is additionally possible to control pumps to act on the reactor.

== Historical background ==
The first controlled lab reactors were derived from the control systems used in chemical plants. These were generally dedicated to specific tasks as reprogramming was difficult. These first systems were often home built and used hardware that was adapted rather than designed for the task

== Current systems ==
Modern CLR systems take a wide range of forms with the ability to work on a range of different volume reactors (and indeed reactor styles). Data is usually transmitted back to a PC to be recorded (and indeed complex recipe based control is usually performed here too) though other systems may use off-line data logging.

== Embedded sensors ==
In the most sophisticated systems that exist, analytical instruments such as raman spectrometers and FTIR probes can also be integrated with the reactor. These more sophisticated systems also allow the closed loop control of the reactor as a result of taking readings from the sensors and analytical instruments concerned.

== Reaction calorimeters ==
Most reaction calorimeters can be used as controlled lab reactors (indeed some calorimeters are based on CLR's).

== See also ==
- Reaction Calorimeter
