= Calorimeter constant =

A calorimeter constant (denoted C_{cal}) is a constant that quantifies the heat capacity of a calorimeter. It may be calculated by applying a known amount of heat to the calorimeter and measuring the calorimeter's corresponding change in temperature. In SI units, the calorimeter constant is then calculated by dividing the change in enthalpy (ΔH) in joules by the change in temperature (ΔT) in kelvins or degrees Celsius:

$$C_\mathrm{cal} = \frac{\Delta{H}}{\Delta{T}}$$

The calorimeter constant is usually presented in units of joules per degree Celsius (J/°C) or joules per kelvin (J/K). Every calorimeter has a unique calorimeter constant.

== Uses ==
The calorimeter constants are used in constant pressure calorimetry to calculate the amount of heat required to achieve a certain raise in the temperature of the calorimeter's contents.

=== Example ===
To determine the change in enthalpy in a neutralization reaction (ΔH_{neutralization}), a known amount of basic solution may be placed in a calorimeter, and the temperature of this solution alone recorded. Then, a known amount of acidic solution may be added and the change in temperature measured using a thermometer. The difference in temperature (ΔT, in units K or °C) may be calculated by subtracting the initial temperature from the final temperature. The value ΔH_{neutralization} may then be calculated according to the following equation:

$$\Delta{H_\mathrm{neutralization}} = C_\mathrm{cal} \cdot \Delta{T}$$

Regardless of the specific chemical process, with a known calorimeter constant and a known change in temperature, the heat added to the system may be calculated by multiplying the calorimeter constant by the change in temperature.

== See also ==
- Thermodynamics
