= Saturn I SA-2 =

Second flight of the Saturn I launch vehicle, April 25, 1962

Saturn-Apollo 2
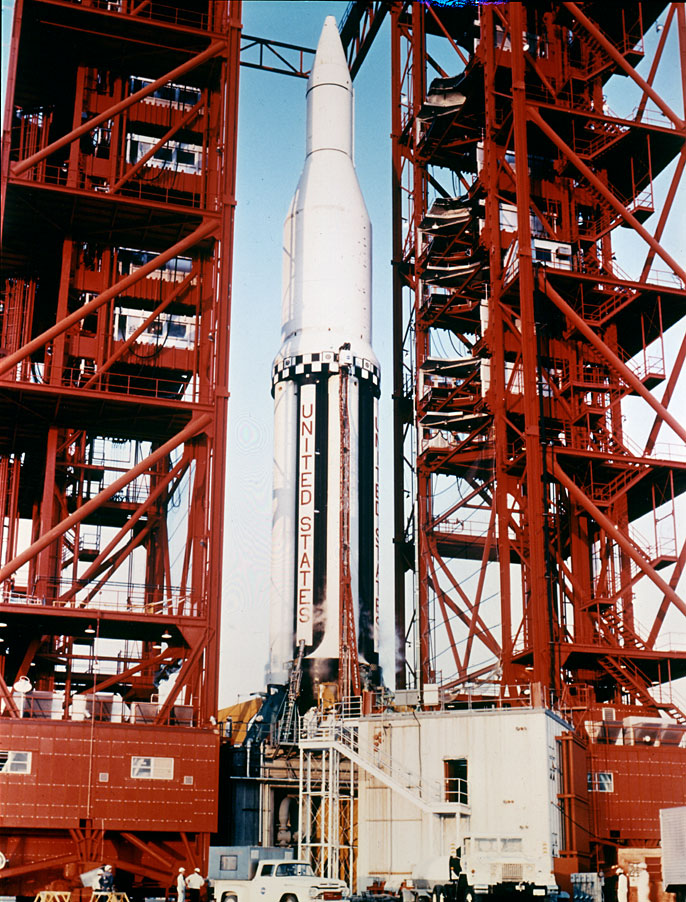
- SA-2 sitting on Pad 34 with service structure
- Mission type: Test flight
- Operator: NASA
- Mission duration: 2 minutes, 40 seconds
- Distance travelled: 80 km (50 mi)
- Apogee: 105.3 km (65.4 mi)

Spacecraft properties
- Launch mass: 420,000 kg (463 short tons)

Start of mission
- Launch date: April 25, 1962, 14:00:34 UTC
- Rocket: Saturn I SA-2
- Launch site: Cape Canaveral LC-34

End of mission
- Destroyed: April 25, 1962, 14:03:14 UTC (Project Highwater)

Saturn-Apollo 2 (SA-2) was the second flight of the Saturn I launch vehicle, the first flight of Project Highwater, and was part of the American Apollo program. The rocket was launched on April 25, 1962, from Cape Canaveral, Florida.

== History ==
Launch preparation for the mission began at Cape Canaveral on February 27, 1962, with the arrival of the second Saturn I launch vehicle. The only significant change made to the vehicle from the previous SA-1 flight was the addition of extra baffles in the propellant tanks to mitigate fuel sloshing. While no serious delays were encountered, there were several minor problems reported.

A leak was detected between the liquid oxygen dome and injector for the #4 H-1 rocket engine; while attempts were made to fix the problem, it was eventually decided to launch without replacing the engine. Minor problems were found in the guidance subsystem and service structure operations, damaged strain gauges were found in a liquid oxygen stud and truss member, and a manhole cover on the dummy Centaur (S-V-D) third stage had to be replaced. Problems arose with two of the fueling computers, but each was repaired. Three hydraulic systems were also listed as potential problems.

Despite the issues encountered during flight preparation, none required the target launch date of April 25 to be pushed back.

== Flight ==
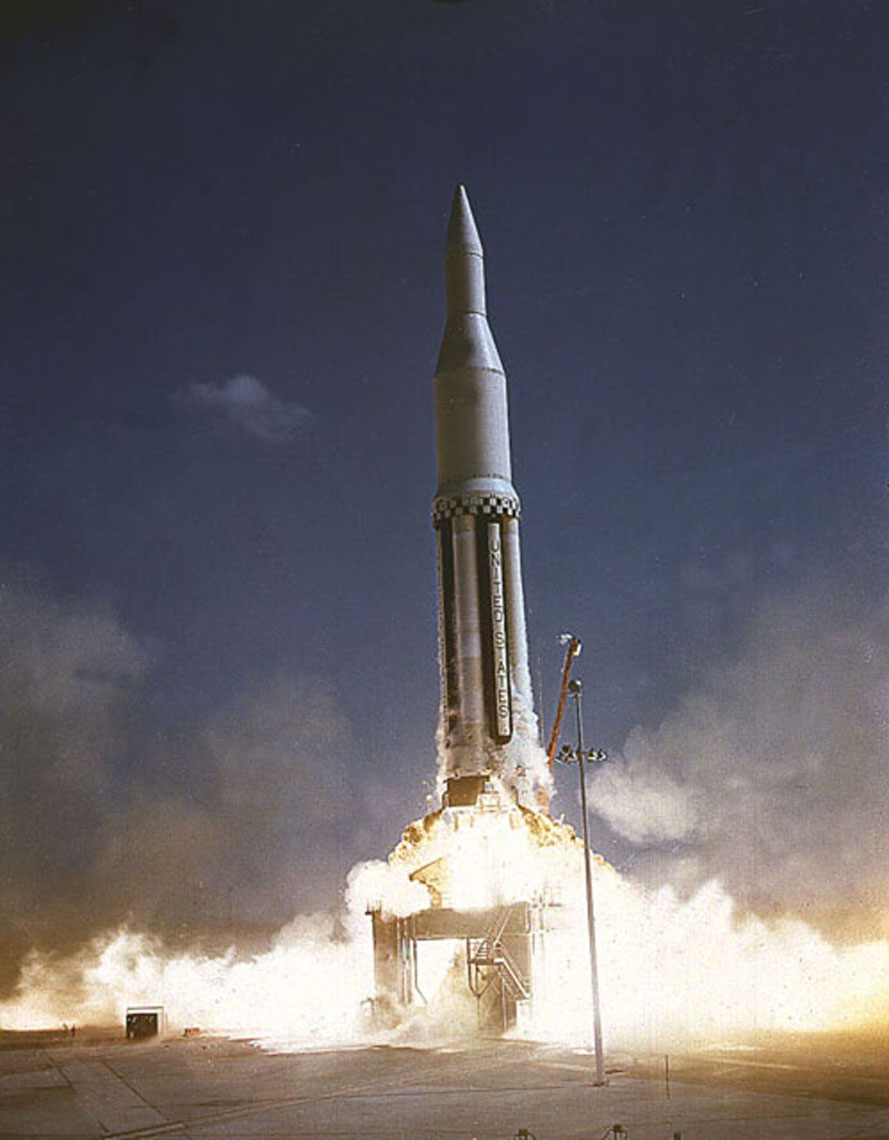
Launch of SA-2

Saturn-Apollo 2 was launched at 14:00:34 UTC on April 25, 1962, from Launch Complex 34. The only hold in the countdown sequence was for 30 minutes due to a vessel which entered the flight safety zone 60 miles (96 km) down range. The rocket carried 619,000 pounds (281,000 kg) of propellant, about 83% of its maximum capacity.

The H-1 engines shut down at an altitude of 35 miles (56 km) after firing for 1 minute 55 seconds and reaching a maximum velocity of 3,750 miles per hour (6,040 km/h; 1,680 m/s). The vehicle continued to coast to an altitude of 65.4 miles (105.3 km), at which point, 2 minutes 40 seconds after launch, officials sent a terminate command to the rocket, setting off several charges which caused the vehicle to destruct.

== Objectives ==
The objectives of SA-2 were much the same as those of SA-1 in that it was primarily a test of the Saturn I rocket and the new H-1 engines. Specifically, its goals were to prove propulsion performance and mission adequacy, vehicle structural design and aerodynamic characteristics, guidance and control systems, and launch facility and ground support equipment. NASA declared all objectives as successful. Additionally, the fuel sloshing issue from SA-1 was minimized.

A second objective of both this mission and SA-3 was Project Highwater, the intentional release of ballast water from the second and third stages which allowed scientists to investigate the nature of Earth's ionosphere, as well as noctilucent clouds and the behavior of ice in space.

SA-2's dummy upper stages contained approximately 190,000 pounds (86,000 kg) of water, or 22,900 U.S. gallons (86,685 L), used to simulate the mass of future payloads. Stage two contained 97,000 pounds (44,000 kg) of water, and stage three contained 93,000 pounds (42,000 kg). When the terminate command was sent to the rocket, dynamite charges split the second stage longitudinally, instantly releasing its water load. Primacord charges created several 1-foot (0.30 m) holes in the third stage, releasing its water over a period of several seconds.

Cameras on the ground immediately recorded the water cloud, and personnel at a ground station began to observe it about four to five seconds after release. Those personnel reported that the cloud dispersed from vision within an average of five seconds, while more sensitive instruments tracked the cloud to a maximum altitude of 100 miles (161 km). The cloud produced lightning-like effects, which Dr. Wernher von Braun described as "probably the first synthetic thunderstorm ever generated in space." Project Highwater on this flight was also declared a success.
