= Reaction calorimeter =

Apparatus for measuring reaction energy

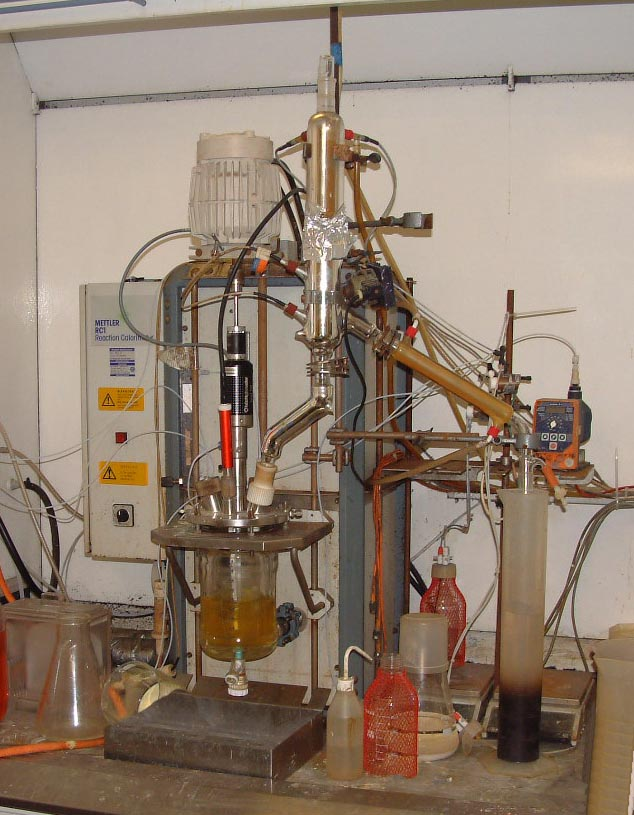
Original RC1 Calorimeter

A reaction calorimeter is a calorimeter that measures the amount of energy released (in exothermic reactions) or absorbed (in endothermic reactions) by a chemical reaction.

== Methods ==
=== Heat flow calorimetry ===
Heat flow calorimetry measures the heat flowing across the reactor wall and quantifies this in relation to other energy flows within the reactor.

$$Q = U A (T_r-T_j)$$

where:

$Q$ → process heating (or cooling) power (W)
$U$ → overall heat transfer coefficient (W/(m^{2}K))
$A$ → heat transfer area (m^{2})
$T_r$ → process temperature (K)
$T_j$ → jacket temperature (K)

Heat flow calorimetry allows the user to measure heat while the process temperature remains under control. While the driving force T_{r} − T_{j} is measured with a relatively high resolution, the overall heat transfer coefficient U or the calibration factor UA is determined by calibration before and after the reaction takes place. These factors are affected by the product composition, process temperature, agitation rate, viscosity, and liquid level.

=== Heat balance calorimetry ===
In heat balance calorimetry, the cooling/heating jacket controls the temperature of the process. Heat is measured by monitoring the heat gained or lost by the heat transfer fluid.

$$Q = m_s C_{ps}(T_i - T_o)$$

where:

$Q$ → is the process heating (or cooling) power (W)
$m_s$ → is the mass flow of heat transfer fluid (kg/s)
$C_{ps}$ → is the specific heat of heat transfer fluid (J/(kg K))
$T_i$ → is the inlet temperature of heat transfer fluid (K)
$T_o$ → is the outlet temperature of heat transfer fluid (K)

Heat balance calorimetry is considered an effective method for measuring heat, as it involves quantifying the heat entering and leaving the system through the heating/cooling jacket using the heat transfer fluid, whose properties are well known.

This method effectively measures heat loss or gain, circumventing many calibration issues associated with heat flow and power compensation calorimetry. However, it is less effective in traditional batch vessels, where significant heat shifts in the cooling/heating jacket can obscure the process's heat signal.

=== Power compensation calorimetry ===
Power compensation calorimetry is a variation of the heat flow technique. This method utilizes a cooling jacket operating at constant flow and temperature. The process temperature is regulated by adjusting the power of an electrical heater. At the start of the experiment, the electrical heat and cooling power are balanced. As the process's heat load changes, the electrical power is adjusted to maintain the desired process temperature. The heat liberated or absorbed by the process is determined from the difference between the initial electrical power and the electrical power required at the time of measurement. While power compensation calorimetry requires less preparation than heat flow calorimetry, it faces similar limitations. Changes in product composition, liquid level, process temperature, agitation, or viscosity can impact the instrument's calibration. Additionally, the presence of an electrical heating element is not optimal for process operations. Another limitation of this method is that the maximum heat it can measure is equal to the initial electrical power applied to the heater.

$$Q = IV\,\,\,\,\,\mathrm {or}\,\,\,\,\,\,(I - I_0)V$$

where:

$I$ is the current supplied to the heater
$V$ is the voltage supplied to the heater
$I_0$ is the current supplied to the heater at equilibrium (assuming constant voltage / resistance)

=== Constant flux calorimetry ===
Diagram of COFLUX system

Constant flux heating and cooling jackets use variable geometry cooling jackets and can operate with cooling jackets at a substantially constant temperature. These reaction calorimeters are simpler to use and are much more tolerant of changes in the process conditions.

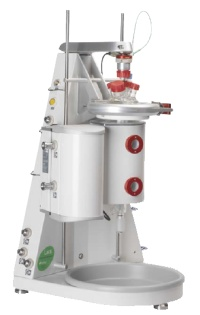
An example of a Co-Flux Calorimeter

Constant flux calorimetry is an advanced temperature control mechanism used to generate accurate calorimetry. It operates by controlling the jacket area of a laboratory reactor while maintaining a constant inlet temperature of the thermal fluid. This method allows for precise temperature control, even during strongly exothermic or endothermic events, as additional cooling can be achieved by increasing the area over which heat is exchanged.

This system is generally more accurate than heat balance calorimetry, as changes in the delta temperature (T_{out} - T_{in}) are magnified by keeping the fluid flow as low as possible.

One of the main advantages of constant flux calorimetry is the ability to dynamically measure heat transfer coefficient (U). According to the heat balance equation:

$$Q=m_f\;C_p\;(T_{in}-T_{out})$$

From the heat flow equation that

$$Q=U\;A\;LMTD$$

These equations can be rearranged to:

$$U=\frac{m_f\;C_p\;(T_{in}-T_{out})}{A\;LMTD}$$

This allows for the monitoring of U as a function of time.

== Instrumentation ==
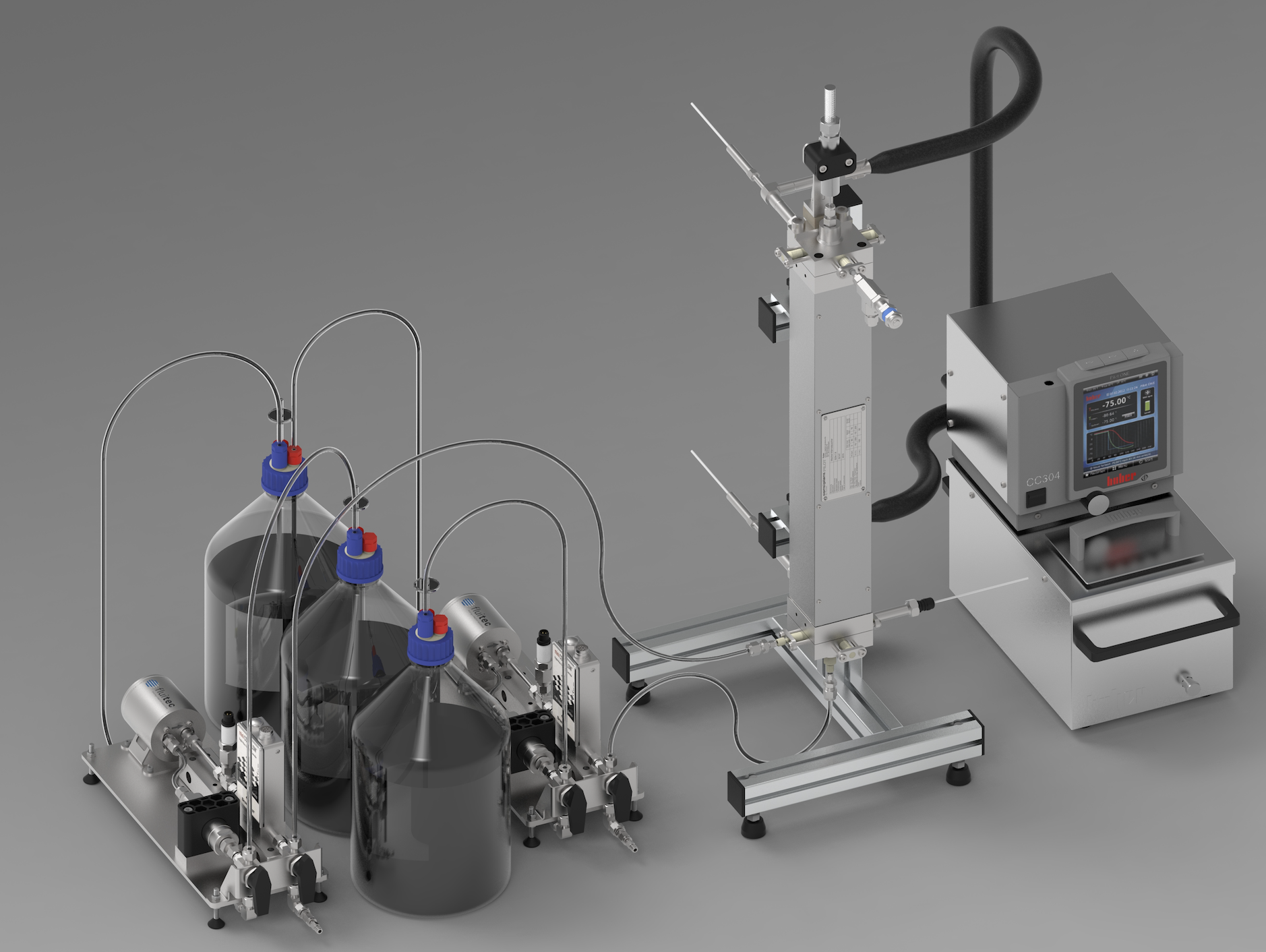
A continuous reaction calorimeter

Different reaction calorimeter designs are used depending on if their application is in batch reactors or continuous flow reactors. In batch reactors, traditional calorimeters are used. In the batch process, one reactant is added continuously in small amounts to achieve complete conversion of the reaction. Batch calorimeters operating microreactors are still considered the state-of-the-art, and control the rate of reactant addition. A continuous flow calorimeter obtains thermodynamic information in a continuous process. Continuous flow calorimeters are of particular use in industrial applications where consistent and reproducible continuous reaction conditions are critical.

== See also ==
- Controlled Lab Reactor
