= Project Highwater =

Upper-atmospheric experiment performed by NASA in 1962

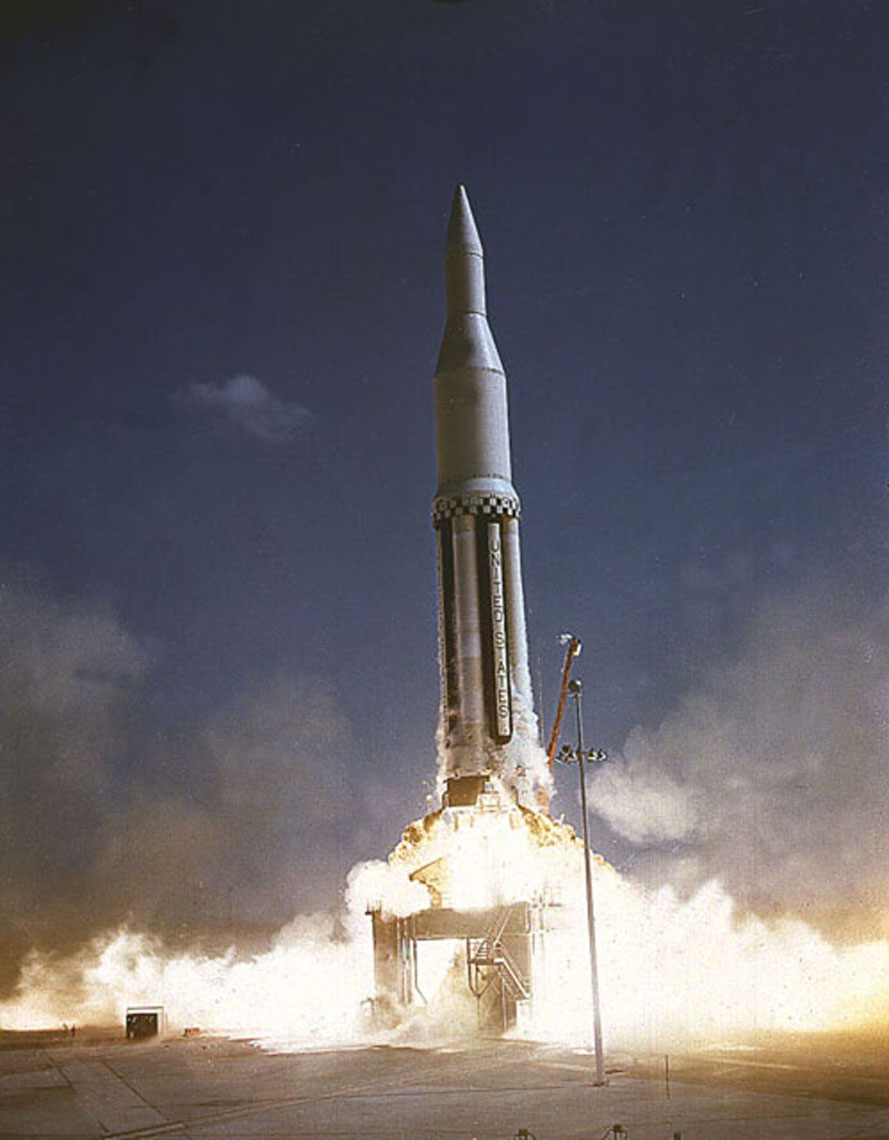
Launch of the first Highwater flight, SA-2 on April 25, 1962

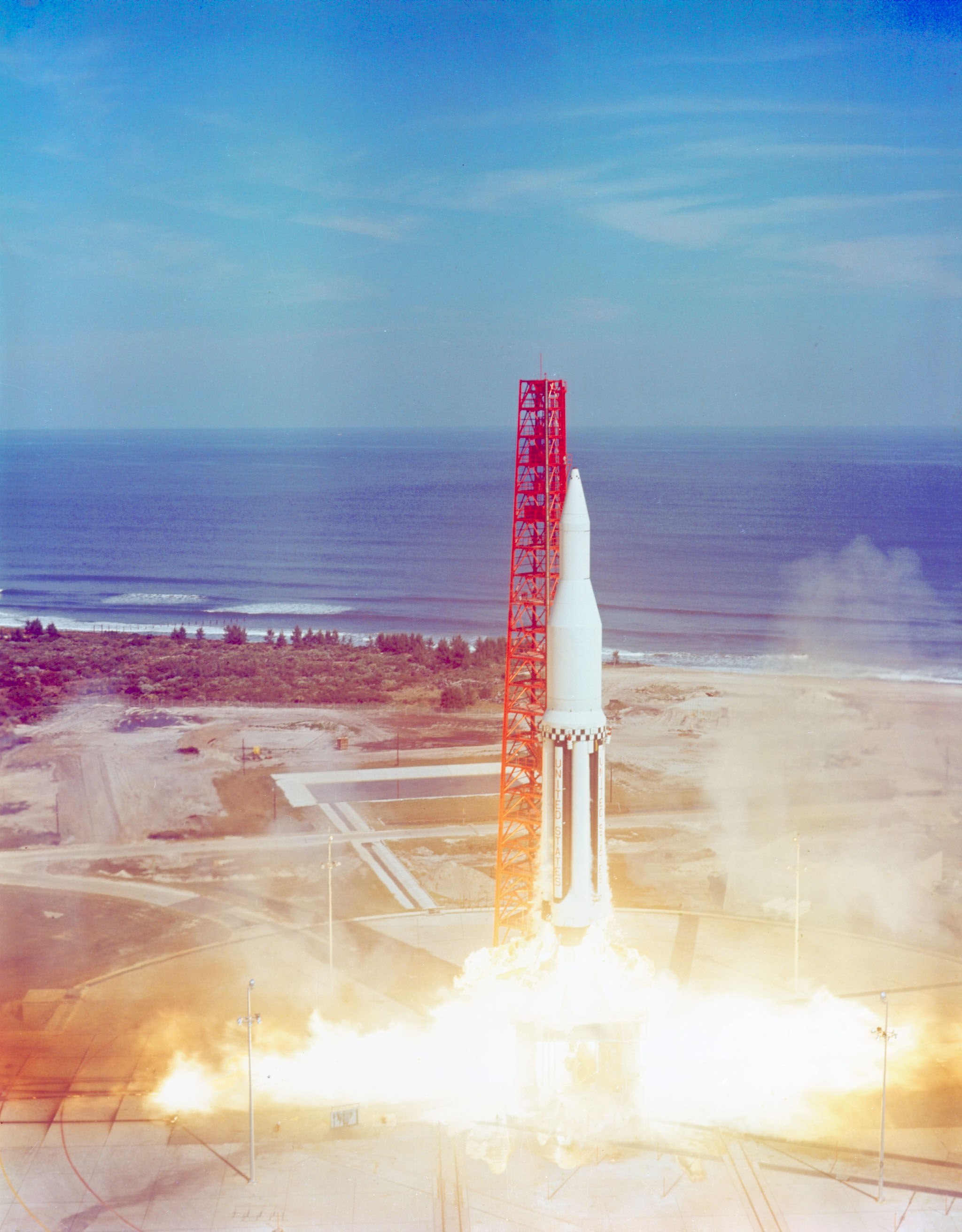
Launch of the second and final Highwater flight, SA-3 on November 16, 1962

Project Highwater was an experiment carried out as part of two of the test flights of NASA's Saturn I launch vehicle (using battleship upper stages), successfully launched into a sub-orbital trajectory from Cape Canaveral, Florida. The Highwater experiment sought to determine the effect of a large volume of water suddenly released into the ionosphere. The project answered questions about the effect of the diffusion of propellants in the event that a rocket was destroyed at high altitude.

The first flight, SA-2, took place on April 25, 1962. After the flight test of the rocket was complete and first stage shutdown occurred, explosive charges on the dummy upper stages destroyed the rocket and released 23,000 U.S. gallons (87,000 liters) of ballast water weighing 190,000 pounds (86,000 kilograms) into the upper atmosphere at an altitude of 65 miles (105 km; 56 nmi), eventually reaching an apex of 90 miles (140 km; 78 nmi).

The second flight, SA-3, launched on November 16, 1962, and involved the same payload. The ballast water was explosively released at the flight's peak altitude of 104 miles (167 km; 90 nmi). For both of these experiments, the resulting ice clouds expanded to several miles in diameter and lightning-like radio disturbances were recorded.

== See also ==
- High-altitude nuclear explosion - other high altitude explosive tests
