= Calorimeter =

Instrument for measuring heat

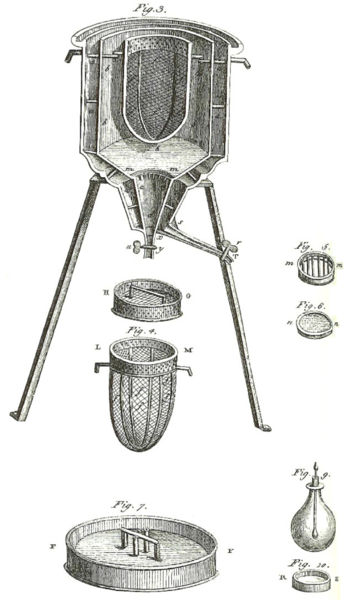
The world's first ice calorimeter, used in the winter of 1782–83, by Antoine Lavoisier and Pierre-Simon Laplace, to determine the heat involved in various chemical changes; calculations were based on Joseph Black's prior discovery of latent heat. These experiments mark the foundation of thermochemistry.

A calorimeter is a device used for calorimetry, or the process of measuring the heat of chemical reactions or physical changes as well as heat capacity. Differential scanning calorimeters, isothermal micro calorimeters, titration calorimeters and accelerated rate calorimeters are among the most common types. A simple calorimeter just consists of a thermometer attached to a metal container full of water suspended above a combustion chamber. It is one of the measurement devices used in the study of thermodynamics, chemistry, and biochemistry.

To find the enthalpy change per mole of a substance $A$ in a reaction between two substances $A$ and $B$, the substances are separately added to a calorimeter and the initial and final temperatures (before the reaction has started and after it has finished) are noted. Multiplying the temperature change by the mass and specific heat capacities of the substances gives a value for the energy given off or absorbed during the reaction. Dividing the energy change by how many moles of $A$ were present gives its enthalpy change of reaction.
$$q = C_\text{v}(T_f - T_i),$$
where q is the amount of heat according to the change in temperature measured in joules and C_{v} is the heat capacity of the calorimeter which is a value associated with each individual apparatus in units of energy per temperature (joules/kelvin).

== History ==
In 1761 Joseph Black introduced the idea of latent heat which led to the creation of the first ice calorimeters. In 1780, Antoine Lavoisier used the heat released by the respiration of a guinea pig to melt snow surrounding his apparatus, showing that respiratory gas exchange is a form of combustion, similar to the burning of a candle. Lavoisier named this apparatus "calorimeter", based on both Greek and Latin roots. One of the first ice calorimeters was used in the winter of 1782–83 by Lavoisier and Pierre-Simon Laplace. It relied on the heat required for the melting of ice to measure the heat released in various chemical reactions.

== Adiabatic calorimeters ==
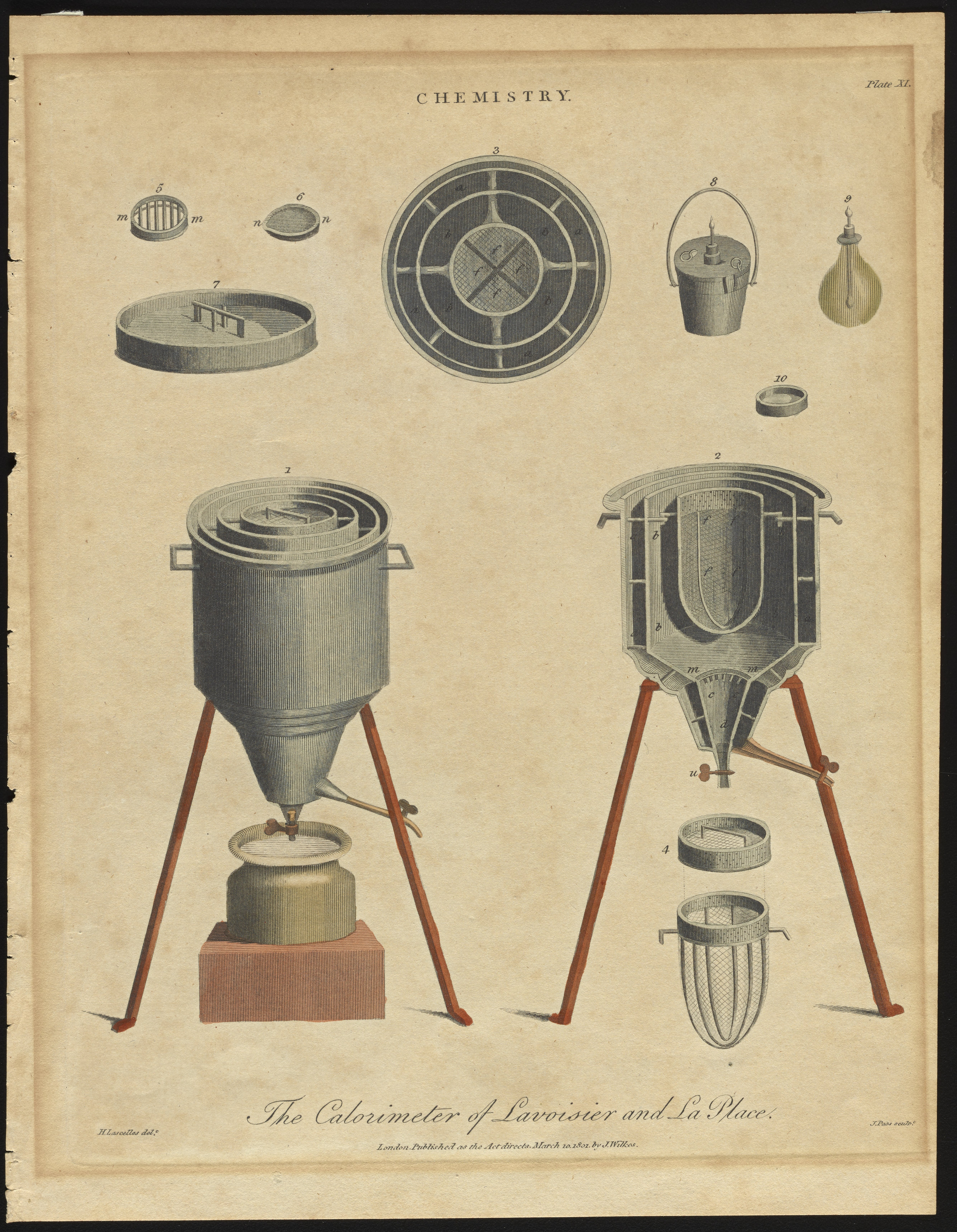
The calorimeter of Lavoisier and La Place, 1801

An adiabatic calorimeter is a calorimeter used to examine a runaway reaction. Since the calorimeter runs in an adiabatic environment, any heat generated by the material sample under test causes the sample to increase in temperature, thus fueling the reaction.

No adiabatic calorimeter is fully adiabatic – some heat will be lost by the sample to the sample holder. A mathematical correction factor, known as the phi-factor, can be used to adjust the calorimetric result to account for these heat losses. The phi-factor is the ratio of the thermal mass of the sample and sample holder to the thermal mass of the sample alone.

== Reaction calorimeters ==
A reaction calorimeter is a calorimeter in which a chemical reaction is initiated within a closed insulated container. Reaction heats are measured and the total heat is obtained by integrating heat flow versus time. This is the standard used in industry to measure heats since industrial processes are engineered to run at constant temperatures.Reaction calorimetry can also be used to determine maximum heat release rate for chemical process engineering and for tracking the global kinetics of reactions. There are four main methods for measuring the heat in reaction calorimeter:

=== Heat flow calorimeter ===
The cooling/heating jacket controls either the temperature of the process or the temperature of the jacket. Heat is measured by monitoring the temperature difference between heat transfer fluid and the process fluid. In addition, fill volumes (i.e. wetted area), specific heat, heat transfer coefficient have to be determined to arrive at a correct value. It is possible with this type of calorimeter to do reactions at reflux, although it is much less accurate.

=== Heat balance calorimeter ===
The cooling/heating jacket controls the temperature of the process. Heat is measured by monitoring the heat gained or lost by the heat transfer fluid.

=== Power compensation ===
Power compensation uses a heater placed within the vessel to maintain a constant temperature. The energy supplied to this heater can be varied as reactions require and the calorimetry signal is purely derived from this electrical power.

=== Constant flux ===
Constant flux calorimetry (or COFLUX as it is often termed) is derived from heat balance calorimetry and uses specialized control mechanisms to maintain a constant heat flow (or flux) across the vessel wall.

== Bomb calorimeters ==
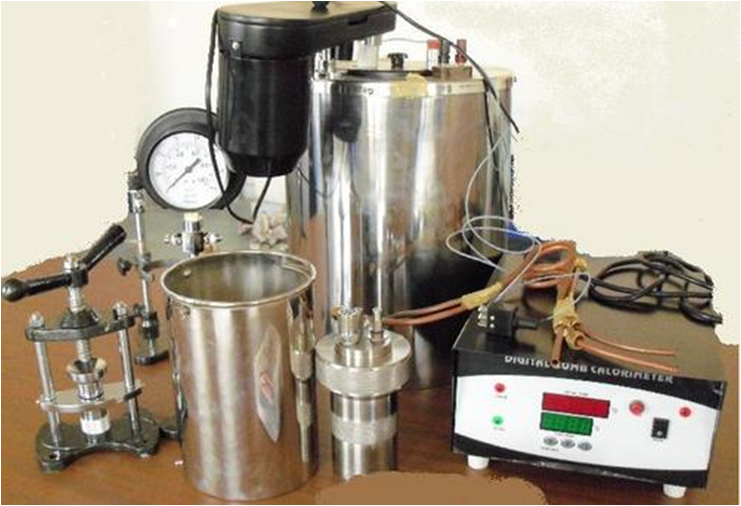
Bomb calorimeter

A bomb calorimeter is a type of constant-volume calorimeter used in measuring the heat of combustion of a particular reaction. Bomb calorimeters have to withstand the large pressure within the calorimeter as the reaction is being measured. Electrical energy is used to ignite the fuel; as the fuel is burning, it will heat up the surrounding air, which expands and escapes through a tube that leads the air out of the calorimeter. When the air is escaping through the copper tube it will also heat up the water outside the tube. The change in temperature of the water allows for calculating calorie content of the fuel.

In more recent calorimeter designs, the whole bomb, pressurized with excess pure oxygen (typically at 30 standard atmospheres (3,000 kPa)) and containing a weighed mass of a sample (typically 1–1.5 g) and a small fixed amount of water (to saturate the internal atmosphere, thus ensuring that all water produced is liquid, and removing the need to include enthalpy of vaporization in calculations), is submerged under a known volume of water (c. 2000 ml) before the charge is electrically ignited. The bomb, with the known mass of the sample and oxygen, form a closed system — no gases escape during the reaction. The weighed reactant put inside the steel container is then ignited. Energy is released by the combustion and heat flow from this crosses the stainless steel wall, thus raising the temperature of the steel bomb, its contents, and the surrounding water jacket. The temperature change in the water is then accurately measured with a thermometer. This reading, along with a bomb factor (which is dependent on the heat capacity of the metal bomb parts), is used to calculate the energy given out by the sample burn. A small correction is made to account for the electrical energy input, the burning fuse, and acid production (by titration of the residual liquid). After the temperature rise has been measured, the excess pressure in the bomb is released.

At its core, a bomb calorimeter consists of a small cup to contain the sample, oxygen, a stainless steel bomb, water, a stirrer, a thermometer, the dewar or insulating container (to prevent heat flow from the calorimeter to its surroundings) and an ignition circuit connected to the bomb. By using stainless steel for the bomb, the reaction will occur with no volume change observed.

Since there is no heat exchange between the calorimeter and surroundings (Q = 0) (adiabatic), no work is performed (W = 0)

Thus, the total internal energy change

$$\Delta E_\text{total} = Q + W = 0$$

Also, total internal energy change

$$\Delta E_\text{total} = \Delta E_\text{system} + \Delta E_\text{surroundings} = 0$$
$\Delta E_\text{system} = -\Delta E_\text{surroundings} = -C_\text{v} \Delta T$

(constant volume $\mathrm{d}V = 0$)

where $C_\text{v}$ is heat capacity of the bomb

Before the bomb can be used to determine heat of combustion of any compound, it must be calibrated. The value of $C_\text{v}$ can be estimated by

$$C_\text{v(calorimeter)} = m_\text{water} C_\text{v(water)} + m_\text{steel} C_\text{v(steel)}$$
$m_\text{water}$ and $m_\text{steel}$ can be measured;
$$C_\text{v(water)} = 1 \text{ cal g}^{-1} \text{ K}^{-1}$$
$$C_\text{v(steel)} = 0.1 \text{ cal g}^{-1} \text{ K}^{-1}$$

In the laboratory, $C_\text{v}$ is determined by running a compound with known heat of combustion value: $C_\text{v} = {H_\text{c} \over \Delta T}$

Common compounds are benzoic acid ($H_\text{c} = 6318 \text{ cal/g}$) or p-methyl benzoic acid ($H_\text{c} = 6957 \text{ cal/g}$).

Temperature (T) is recorded every minute and $\Delta T = T_\text{final} - T_\text{initial}$

A small factor contributes to the correction of the total heat of combustion is the fuse wire. Nickel fuse wire is often used and has heat of combustion: 981.2 cal/g.

In order to calibrate the bomb, a small amount (~ 1 g) of benzoic acid, or p-methyl benzoic acid is weighed. A length of nickel fuse wire (~10 cm) is weighed both before and after the combustion process. Mass of fuse wire burned $\Delta m = m_\text{before} - m_\text{after}$

The combustion of sample (benzoic acid) inside the bomb

$$\Delta H_{c} = \Delta H_\ce{c(benzoic\ acid)} m_\ce{benzoic\ acid} + \Delta H_\ce{c(Ni\ fuse\ wire)} \Delta m_\ce{Ni\ fuse\ wire}$$
$$\Delta H_\text{c} = C_\text{v} \Delta T\ \rightarrow C_\text{v} = {\Delta H_\text{c} \over \Delta T}$$

Once $C_\text{v}$ value of the bomb is determined, the bomb is ready to use to calculate heat of combustion of any compounds by

$\Delta H_\text{c} = C_\text{v} \Delta T$

== Combustion of non-flammables ==
The higher pressure and concentration of O_{2} in the bomb system can render combustible some compounds that are not normally flammable. Some substances do not combust completely, making the calculations harder as the remaining mass has to be taken into consideration, making the possible error considerably larger and compromising the data.

When working with compounds that are not as flammable (that might not combust completely) one solution would be to mix the compound with some flammable compounds with a known heat of combustion and make a pallet with the mixture. Once the $C_\text{v}$ of the bomb is known, the heat of combustion of the flammable compound (C_{FC}), of the wire (C_{W}) and the masses (m_{FC} and m_{W}), and the temperature change (ΔT), the heat of combustion of the less flammable compound (C_{LFC}) can be calculated with:

C_{LFC} = C_{v} ΔT − C_{FC} m_{FC} − C_{W} m_{W}

== Calvet-type calorimeters ==
The detection is based on a three-dimensional fluxmeter sensor. The fluxmeter element consists of a ring of several thermocouples in series. The corresponding thermopile of high thermal conductivity surrounds the experimental space within the calorimetric block. The radial arrangement of the thermopiles guarantees an almost complete integration of the heat. This is verified by the calculation of the efficiency ratio that indicates that an average value of 94% ± 1% of heat is transmitted through the sensor on the full range of temperature of the Calvet-type calorimeter. In this setup, the sensitivity of the calorimeter is not affected by the crucible, the type of purgegas, or the flow rate. The main advantage of the setup is the increase of the experimental vessel's size and consequently the size of the sample, without affecting the accuracy of the calorimetric measurement.

The calibration of the calorimetric detectors is a key parameter and has to be performed very carefully. For Calvet-type calorimeters, a specific calibration, so called Joule effect or electrical calibration, has been developed to overcome all the problems encountered by a calibration done with standard materials. The main advantages of this type of calibration are as follows:

- It is an absolute calibration.
- The use of standard materials for calibration is not necessary. The calibration can be performed at a constant temperature, in the heating mode and in the cooling mode.
- It can be applied to any experimental vessel volume.
- It is a very accurate calibration.

An example of Calvet-type calorimeter is the C80 Calorimeter (reaction, isothermal and scanning calorimeter).

== Adiabatic and Isoperibol calorimeters ==
Sometimes referred to as constant-pressure calorimeters, adiabatic calorimeters measure the change in enthalpy of a reaction occurring in solution during which the no heat exchange with the surroundings is allowed (adiabatic) and the atmospheric pressure remains constant.

An example is a coffee-cup calorimeter, which is constructed from two nested Styrofoam cups, providing insulation from the surroundings, and a lid with two holes, allowing insertion of a thermometer and a stirring rod. The inner cup holds a known amount of a solvent, usually water, that absorbs the heat from the reaction. When the reaction occurs, the outer cup provides insulation. Then

$$C_\text{p} = \frac {W\Delta H}{M\Delta T}$$

where

$C_\text{p}$, Specific heat at constant pressure
$\Delta H$, Enthalpy of solution
$\Delta T$, Change in temperature
$W$, mass of solvent
$M$, molecular mass of solvent

The measurement of heat using a simple calorimeter, like the coffee cup calorimeter, is an example of constant-pressure calorimetry, since the pressure (atmospheric pressure) remains constant during the process. Constant-pressure calorimetry is used in determining the changes in enthalpy occurring in solution. Under these conditions the change in enthalpy equals the heat.

Commercial calorimeters operate in a similar way. The semi-adiabatic (isoperibol) calorimeters measure temperature changes up to 10^{−6} °C and account for heat loss through the walls of the reaction vessel to the environment, hence, semi-adiabatic. The reaction vessel is a dewar flask which is immersed in a constant temperature bath. This provides a constant heat leak rate that can be corrected through the software. The heat capacity of the reactants (and the vessel) are measured by introducing a known amount of heat using a heater element (voltage and current) and measuring the temperature change.

Adiabatic calorimeters most commonly used in materials science research to study reactions that occur at a constant pressure and volume. They are particularly useful for determining the heat capacity of substances, measuring the enthalpy changes of chemical reactions, and studying the thermodynamic properties of materials.

== Differential scanning calorimeter ==
In a differential scanning calorimeter (DSC), heat flow into a sample—usually contained in a small aluminium capsule or 'pan'—is measured differentially, i.e., by comparing it to the flow into an empty reference pan.

In a heat flux DSC, both pans sit on a small slab of material with a known (calibrated) heat resistance K. The temperature of the calorimeter is raised linearly with time (scanned), i.e., the heating rate

$$\frac{\mathrm{d}T}{\mathrm{d}t}=\beta$$

is kept constant. This time linearity requires good design and good (computerized) temperature control. Of course, controlled cooling and isothermal experiments are also possible.

Heat flows into the two pans by conduction. The flow of heat into the sample is larger because of its heat capacity C_{p}. The difference in flow dq/dt induces a small temperature difference ΔT across the slab. This temperature difference is measured using a thermocouple. The heat capacity can in principle be determined from this signal:

$$\Delta T = K {dq \over dt} = K C_\text{p}\, \beta$$

Note that this formula (equivalent to Newton's law of heat flow) is analogous to, and much older than, Ohm's law of electric flow:

ΔV = RdQ/dt = RI.

When suddenly heat is absorbed by the sample (e.g., when the sample melts), the signal will respond and exhibit a peak.

$${dq \over dt} = C_\text{p} \beta + f(t, T)$$

From the integral of this peak the enthalpy of melting can be determined, and from its onset the melting temperature.

Differential scanning calorimetry is a workhorse technique in many fields, particularly in polymer characterization.

A modulated temperature differential scanning calorimeter (MTDSC) is a type of DSC in which a small oscillation is imposed upon the otherwise linear heating rate.

This has a number of advantages. It facilitates the direct measurement of the heat capacity in one measurement, even in (quasi-)isothermal conditions. It permits the simultaneous measurement of heat effects that respond to a changing heating rate (reversing) and that don't respond to the changing heating rate (non-reversing). It allows for the optimization of both sensitivity and resolution in a single test by allowing for a slow average heating rate (optimizing resolution) and a fast changing heating rate (optimizing sensitivity).

A DSC may also be used as an initial safety screening tool. In this mode the sample will be housed in a non-reactive crucible (often gold, or gold-plated steel), and which will be able to withstand pressure (typically up to 100 bar). The presence of an exothermic event can then be used to assess the stability of a substance to heat. However, due to a combination of relatively poor sensitivity, slower than normal scan rates (typically 2–3 °C per min) due to much heavier crucible, and unknown activation energy, it is necessary to deduct about 75–100 °C from the initial start of the observed exotherm to suggest a maximum temperature for the material. A much more accurate data set can be obtained from an adiabatic calorimeter, but such a test may take 2–3 days from ambient at a rate of 3 °C increment per half hour.

== Isothermal titration calorimeter ==
In an isothermal titration calorimeter, the heat of reaction is used to follow a titration experiment. This permits determination of the midpoint (stoichiometry) (N) of a reaction as well as its enthalpy (delta H), entropy (delta S) and of primary concern the binding affinity (Ka)

The technique is gaining in importance particularly in the field of biochemistry, because it facilitates determination of substrate binding to enzymes. The technique is commonly used in the pharmaceutical industry to characterize potential drug candidates.

== Continuous Reaction Calorimeter ==
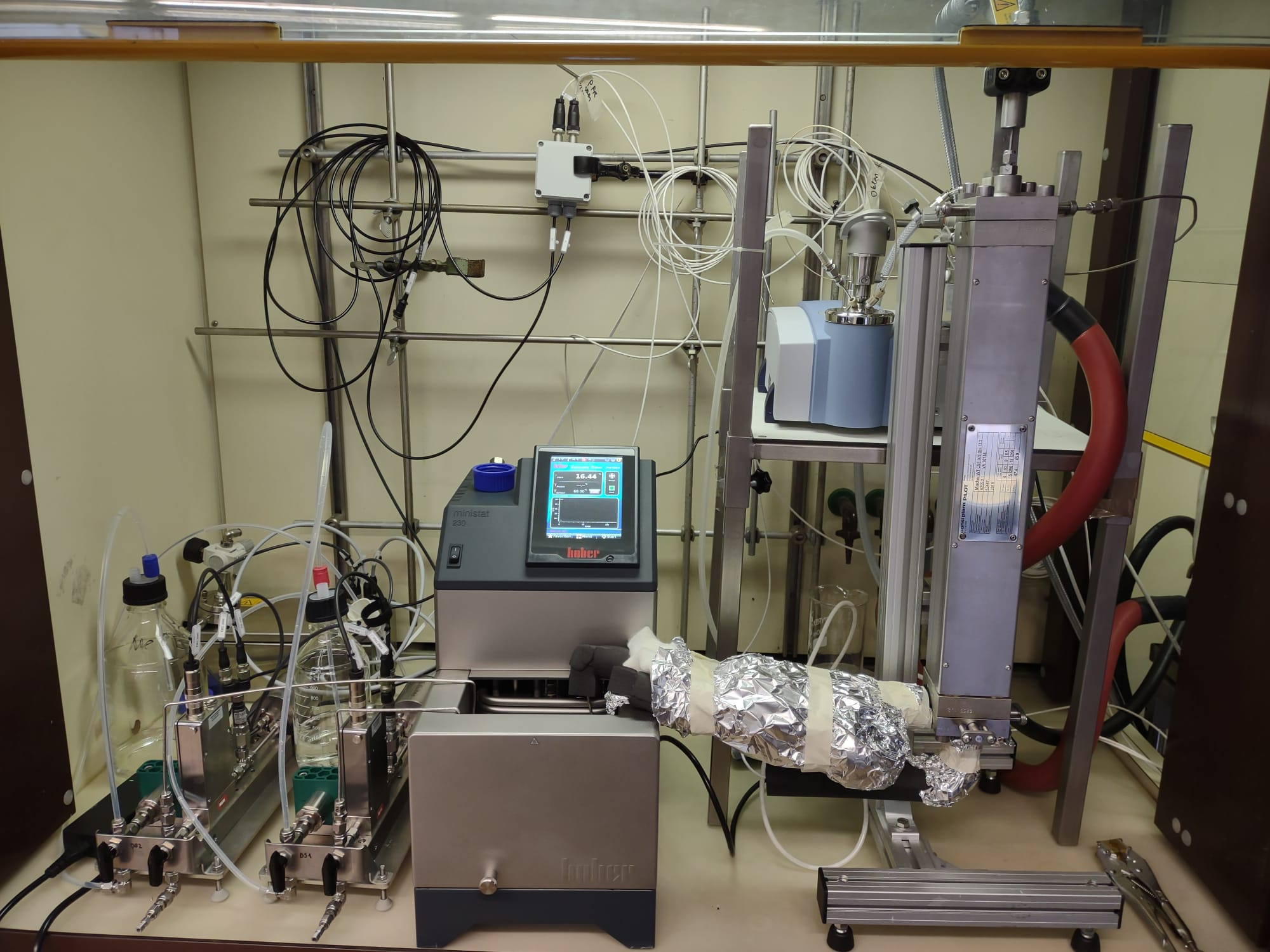
Continuous reaction calorimeter

The Continuous Reaction Calorimeter is especially suitable to obtain thermodynamic information for a scale-up of continuous processes in tubular reactors. This is useful because the released heat can strongly depend on the reaction control, especially for non-selective reactions. With the Continuous Reaction Calorimeter an axial temperature profile along the tube reactor can be recorded and the specific heat of reaction can be determined by means of heat balances and segmental dynamic parameters. The system must consist of a tubular reactor, dosing systems, preheaters, temperature sensors and flow meters.

In traditional heat flow calorimeters, one reactant is added continuously in small amounts, similar to a semi-batch process, in order to obtain a complete conversion of the reaction. In contrast to the tubular reactor, this leads to longer residence times, different substance concentrations and flatter temperature profiles. Thus, the selectivity of not well-defined reactions can be affected. This can lead to the formation of by-products or consecutive products which alter the measured heat of reaction, since other bonds are formed. The amount of by-product or secondary product can be found by calculating the yield of the desired product.

If the heat of reaction measured in the HFC (Heat flow calorimetry) and PFR calorimeter differ, most probably some side reactions have occurred. They could for example be caused by different temperatures and residence times. The totally measured Qr is composed of partially overlapped reaction enthalpies (ΔHr) of main and side reactions, depending on their degrees of conversion (U).

== Calorimetry in Geothermal Reactors ==
Calorimeters can be used to measure the efficiency of geothermal energy conversion processes. Through measuring the heat input and output of the process, engineers can determine how effective the plant is at converting geothermal energy into usable electricity or other forms of energy.

Calorimeters can also monitor the quality of the steam extracted from the geothermal resource. By analyzing the heat content of the steam, engineers can ensure that the resource meets the required specifications for efficient energy production.

== See also ==
- Enthalpy
- Heat
- Calorie
- Heat of combustion
- Calorimeter constant
- Reaction calorimeter
- Calorimeter (particle physics)
