= Orion =

Orion may refer to:

== Common meanings ==
- Orion (constellation), named after the mythical hunter
- Orion (mythology), a hunter in Greek mythology
- Orion Arm, the Milky Way's galactic arm which contains the Solar System
- Orion Nebula, in the constellation

== Arts and media ==
=== Fictional entities ===
==== Characters and species ====
- Orion (character), a DC Comics character
- Orion (Star Trek), a sentient alien species
- Orion, code name of Stephen J. Bartowski on the television show Chuck
- Orion, in the fighting game Brawlhalla
- Orions, a race in the Starfire board game and book series
- Orion, a character from Power Rangers Super Megaforce
- Captain Orion, in the Japanese series X-Bomber
- Orion Pax, the former name of Optimus Prime
- Orion Black, the father of Sirius Black and Regulus Black, in the Harry Potter Series
- Orion Mendelson, the boy from Orion and the Dark

==== Vessels ====
- Orion, a spaceplane in the film 2001: A Space Odyssey
- Orion, a spaceship in Raumpatrouille Orion (Space Patrol Orion in English), the first German science fiction television series
- "Orion"-class spaceship, on the television series Ascension

=== Literature ===
- Orion, an 1843 poem by Richard Henry Horne
- Orion, a 1978 novel by Gail Brewer-Giorgio
- Orion and King Arthur, a 2012 novel series by Ben Bova
- The Orion (book), 1893, on sociology by Bal Gangadhar Tilak
- Dead at Daybreak, a 1998 novel by Deon Meyer, originally published as Orion

=== Music ===
==== Albums and long-form compositions ====
- Orion (Ryan Adams album)
- Orion (X Ambassadors album)
- Orion (Vivier), a 1979 orchestral work by Claude Vivier
- Orion (Lacoste), an opera by the French composer Louis Lacoste
- Orion (composition), 2002, by Kaija Saariaho
- Orion, a 2004 Philip Glass composition
- Orion, an album by she (Swedish band)
- Orion & Pleiades (1984), a symphonic work by Toru Takemitsu

==== Songs ====
- "Orion" (Girl Next Door song)
- "Orion" (Mika Nakashima song)
- "Orion" (Metallica song), an instrumental piece on the album Master of Puppets
- "Orion" (Yoasobi song)
- "Orion", by 12012
- "Orion", in the boxed set Dead Can Dance (1981–1998) by Dead Can Dance
- "Orion", on Stormwatch by Jethro Tull
- "Orion", a 2017 non-album single by Kenshi Yonezu

==== Other uses in music ====
- Orion Records (1960s–1980s), a classical record label
- Orion (singer) (Jimmy Ellis, 1945–1998), American singer
- Youth (musician) (Martin Glover, born 1960), British musician also known as Orion
- Orion the Hunter (band), a 1980s American rock band; also the title of their eponymous 1985 debut (and only) album

=== Periodicals ===
- Orion (manga), by Masamune Shirow
- Orion (online magazine), focused on nature, environment and culture
- Orion (1840s magazine), an American literary magazine that ran from 1842 to 1844
- ORiON, the journal of the Operations Research Society of South Africa
- Ginga Densetsu Weed: Orion, a manga by Yoshihiro Takahashi
- The Orion (California State University, Chico), a student newspaper

=== Other uses in arts and media ===
- Orion (film), a Canadian film
- Orion (sculpture), work by Mark di Suvero
- Miss Riboet's Orion (1925–42), a theatrical troupe active in the Dutch East Indies
- "Orion" (The Night Agent), a 2026 television episode

== Buildings ==
- The Orion (skyscraper) in New York City
- Orion Assembly, a General Motors assembly plant in Orion Township, Michigan
- Orion Building, a residential building in Birmingham, England
- Orion, the movie theater of Finland's National Audiovisual Archive
- Orion Theatre, largest avant-garde theatrical/artist stage in Stockholm, Sweden
- Orion Mall, Bangalore, India; a shopping mall

== Companies ==
=== Arts and media ===
- Orion Pictures, an American film production company, now a subsidiary of MGM
- Orion Publishing Group, a UK-based book publisher
- Orion Records (1960s–1980s), a classical record label
- Orion Broadcasting, a broadcasting company in Louisville, Kentucky

=== Electrical power and electronics ===
- Orion Electric, a Japanese electronics company
- Orion Electronics, a Hungarian company
- Orion Energy Systems, an American power technology company
- Orion New Zealand Limited, a New Zealand electricity distribution company

=== Food and beverage ===
- Orion Breweries, the fifth-largest beer brewery in Japan
- Orion Corporation (South Korean company), a South Korean confectionery company
- Orion, a Czech chocolate confectionery, subsidiary of Nestlé since 1999

=== Transportation and vehicles ===
==== Transport carriers ====
- Orion Airways, a UK airline that operated from 1979 to 1989
- Orion Air, a Seychelles airline
- Orion Air (United States), a US contract freight airline that operated 1981–1989
- Orion Expedition Cruises, an Australian cruise line
- Orionair, a Spanish charter airline
- Orionair, name used by Luxembourg airline Lionair when operating flights to the US

==== Vehicle manufacturers ====
- Orion Bus Industries, a Canadian bus manufacturer
- Orion Space, a Nepalese company producing the Nepal PQ-1 picosatellite
- Orionette, also known as Orion AG für Motorfahrzeuge, a German motorcycle manufacturer

=== Other companies ===
- Orion Telescopes & Binoculars, an American company
- Orion Corporation (pharmaceutical company), a Finnish pharmaceutical company
- Orion Group (Bangladesh), a Bangladeshi industrial conglomerates
  - Orion Pharma (Bangladesh), a Bangladeshi pharmaceutical company

== People ==
- Orion (name)
- Orion, industry name of record producer Darren Tate (born 1972)
- Tomasz Wróblewski (born 1980), Polish musician, known by the stage name "Orion"
- Jimmy "Orion" Ellis (1945–1998), American rockabilly singer

== Places ==
=== United States ===
- Orion, Alabama, an unincorporated community
- Orion, Illinois, a village
  - Orion Township, Fulton County, Illinois
  - Orion High School, in Orion, Illinois
- Orion, Wisconsin, a town
  - Orion (community), Wisconsin, an unincorporated community
- Orion Township, Michigan
- Orion Township, Minnesota

=== Elsewhere ===
- Orion, Alberta, Canada, a hamlet
- Orion, Bataan, the Philippines, a municipality
- Orion, Pyrénées-Atlantiques, France, a commune
- Orion, Queensland, Australia, a village in the Central Highlands Region
- Orion Passage, a narrow sailing route on the northwestern tip of Antarctica

== Science and technology ==
=== Astronomy ===
- Orion (constellation), named after the mythical hunter
  - Orion molecular cloud complex, a star-forming region
  - Orion Nebula, in the constellation
- Orion Arm, a galactic spiral arm which contains Earth

=== Biology ===
- Orion (beetle), a genus of beetles
- Orion (grape), a white wine grape variety
- Historis odius, the Orion, a butterfly in the genus Historis

=== Computing ===
- ORION (research and education network), the provincial research network of Ontario, Canada
- Orion (system-on-a-chip), used in network-attached storage
- Ferranti Orion, a mid-range mainframe computer introduced in 1959
- HLH Orion, a series of minicomputers produced in the 1980s
- Orion Application Server, a Java EE application server
- Orion Browser, a web browser from Kagi Inc.
- Orion quantum computing system, developed by D-Wave Systems
- Orion, a browser-based IDE and open tool integration platform from Eclipse
- Orion, IT admin software by SolarWinds
- GPT-4.5, a 2025 large language model developed by OpenAI

=== Other technologies ===
- Orion (laser), a large laser installation in the UK
- Orion (space telescope), two research instruments on a 1970s Soviet spacecraft

== Sports ==
=== Football (soccer) ===
- A.D. Orión, a Panamanian football club
- Orión F.C., a Costa Rican football club
- Orion F.C., a Scottish football club

=== Other sports ===
- Goyang Orion Orions, a South Korean basketball team
- Orions, former name of the Chiba Lotte Marines, a Japanese baseball team

== Transportation and military ==
=== Air ===
- Lockheed P-3 Orion, a maritime patrol aircraft
- Lockheed Model 9 Orion, a passenger aircraft introduced in 1931
- Aurora Flight Sciences Orion, an American drone
- Bristol Orion, a cancelled aero engine developed by Bristol Siddeley
- Kronshtadt Orion, a Russian UCAV drone

=== Land ===
- Ford Orion, a car
- Orion, a South Devon Railway Comet-class steam locomotive
- Orion, a GWR 3300-class steam locomotive
- Mitsubishi Orion engine, a series of internal combustion engines produced by Mitsubishi Motors

=== Sea ===
==== Military vessels ====
- USS Orion, several U.S. Navy vessels
- HMS Orion, several Royal Navy vessels
- Orion-class battleship, a series of super-dreadnoughts of the Royal Navy
- HMAS Orion, an Oberon-class submarine of the Royal Australian Navy
- HSwMS Orion (A201), a Swedish ELINT vessel
- French ship Orion (1787), a Téméraire-class of the French Navy
- German auxiliary cruiser Orion, World War II merchant raider
- BAE Orion (H-101), Ecuadorian Navy ship, originally USS Mulberry (AN-27)
- NRP Oríon (P1156), a Portuguese Navy Centauro-class fiscalization boat

==== Other vessels ====
- Orion (paddle steamer), a ship which sank off Portpatrick, Scotland in 1850
- MV Orion, a cruise ship
- RMS Orion, an ocean liner of the Orient Steam Navigation Company
- SS Orion, a Swedish steel steamship decommissioned in 1979, now a museum ship
- Orion 50, an American sailboat design
- Orion (ship, 1904), built as a whale-catcher, she later served as a fireboat in Vancouver

=== Space ===
==== Rockets ====
- Orion (rocket), a US sounding rocket
- Orión (rocket), an Argentine sounding rocket
- Orion (rocket stage), a series of rocket motors used in the Pegasus rockets
- Project Orion (nuclear propulsion), a 1958 US nuclear pulse propulsion study project

==== Space vehicles ====
- Orion (spacecraft), NASA crew vehicle first flown in 2022
- Orion (space telescope), two instruments flown aboard Soviet spacecraft
- Orion, the Lunar Module used in the Apollo 16 mission
- Orion (satellite), a series of reconnaissance satellites
- A series of satellites operated by Orion Network Systems, now part of Telesat
- Orion 3, an off-course communication satellite (1999)
- Blok DM-03, a variant of the Russian upper stage rocket

== Other uses ==
- Orion (mythology), a hunter in Greek mythology
- Orion (dog), a rescue dog
- Orion (roller coaster), a steel roller coaster at Kings Island, in Mason, Ohio, US
- Orion, the flagship wine of American winemaker Sean Thackrey
- "Our Race is Our Nation", a slogan used by the Ku Klux Klan and other white nationalists

== See also ==
- Arion (disambiguation)
- EURion constellation, anti-counterfeiting patterns integrated into various kinds of currency
- Exercise Orion (disambiguation)
- Orione (opera) (1653), by Francesco Cavalli
- O'Ryan
- Orion 1 (disambiguation)
- Orion 2 (disambiguation)
- Orion the Hunter (disambiguation)
- Project Orion (disambiguation)
