= Arion (disambiguation) =

Arion was a Greek poet.

Arion may also refer to:

== Businesses ==
- Arion Press, a publisher based in San Francisco
- Arion (record label), a French recording company founded in 1962
- Arion Lightning type of an aircraft

== Media ==
- Arion (Matho), a 1714 opera
- Arion (manga), a 1979 manga and an anime movie based on the manga
- Arion (character), a comic book character published by DC Comics

== Music ==
- Arion Baroque Orchestra, Canadian orchestra
- Arion (band), a Finnish metal band
- Arion (record label)
- Arion Band, an American community band
- Arion Gesangverein, a German American musical group
- Arion Music Awards, Greek music awards, organised from 2002 to 2007

== People ==
- Arion (surname)
- Acrion, a Pythagorean philosopher whose name was misread by Valerius Maximus as Arion
- Arion Carter (born 2004), American football player

== Places ==
- Arion (Crete), a town of ancient Crete
- Arion, Iowa, a town in the United States

== Science ==
- Arion (gastropod), a genus of roundback slugs
- Arion (planet) or 18 Delphini b, an exoplanet

== Other uses ==
- Arion (journal), a journal of humanities and the classics published at Boston University
- Arion (horse), an immortal horse in Greek mythology
- Arion (software), a render engine developed by RandomControl
- MS Arion, a cruise ship
- Arion 1 and Arion 2, rockets under development by PLD Space

== See also ==
- Orion (disambiguation)
