= Orion (ship) =

Orion is the name of various ships and a ship class:

== Naval ==
- BAE Orion, Ecuadorian Navy ship, originally USS Mulberry
- French ship Orion, Royal French Navy ship of the line
- German auxiliary cruiser Orion, a Nazi German auxiliary cruiser
- HMAS Orion, Royal Australian Navy submarine
- HMS Orion, various British Royal Navy ships
- Orion-class battleship, British Royal Navy battleship class
- HSwMS Orion, Royal Swedish Navy ships
- USS Orion, various US Navy ships

== Civilian ==
- MS Nordic Orion, an Arctic ice-strengthened cargo ship
- MV Orion (also known as MS Orion, MY Orion), a National Geographic exploration ship
- MV Orion, a Greek ro-ro freight ferry, previously Pentland Ferries' Orcadia and Caledonian MacBrayne's Saturn
- Orion, a heavy lift vessel (HLV) operated by DEME Offshore, a subsidiary of the DEME Group.
- Orion (1904 ship)
- Orion (paddle steamer), a British ferry which sank in 1850
- RMS Orion, an Orient Steam Navigation modified Orama-class ocean liner
- SS Orion, a Swedish salvage ship and museum ship
- SS Prinz Oskar, renamed Orion by 1919
