= Arion (surname) =

Arion is a Romanian surname with roots in Greece. Notable persons with that surname include:

- Anton I. Arion (1824–1897), Romanian politician
- Bryan Arion, Mexican actor and model
- Constantin C. Arion (1855–1923), Romanian politician
- Frank Martinus Arion (1936–2015), Curaçaoan poet, novelist, and language advocate
- George Arion (born 1946), Romanian crime writer
- Mihail Arion, Romanian diplomat
- Ruth Arion (1912–1998), German-Israeli painter and enamel artist
- Spiros Arion (born 1940), Greek professional wrestler
