= Altair 4 =

Altair 4 may refer to:

- The fictional planet Altair IV, in the 1956 film Forbidden Planet
- The storage planet named after Forbidden Planet's Altair IV from the novel The Tommyknockers by Stephen King
- A potential future NASA lunar landing mission
- A song from the 1990 album Tales from the Twilight World, by German power metal band Blind Guardian which refers to Stephen King.
