= Orion 1 =

Orion 1 or Orion-1 may refer to:

- Exploration Flight Test-1, the first test launch of the Orion space capsule in 2014
- Orión (rocket), a sounding rocket prototype from Argentina, launched in 1965 and 1966
- Orion (space telescope), a space telescope flown in 1971 aboard the Salyut 1 space station
- Orion 1, a communications satellite launched in 1994, later renamed Telstar 11
- Mission Orion 1, a cancelled Constellation program
- Orion I, a transit bus manufactured by Ontario Bus Industries

== See also ==
- 1 Orionis, a star in the constellation of Orion
