= Can You Feel the Beat: The Lisa Lisa Story =

2025 biographical film

- Written by: Rebecca Murga
- Directed by: Tailiah Breon
- Starring: Lisa Velez; Jearnest Corchado; Bre-Z; Angie Martinez
- Music by: Kurt Farquhar
- Country of origin: United States
- Original language: English

Production
- Executive producers: Tracy "Twinkie" Byrd; Lisa Velez; Toni Ménage; Abbey Sibucao; Ron Robinson; Eric Tomosunas; Richard Foster; Chet Fenster
- Cinematography: Eunah Lee
- Editor: Kathleen McAuley
- Running time: 90 minutes
- Production companies: Swirl Films; GroupM Motion Entertainment

Original release
- Network: Lifetime
- Release: February 1, 2025

Can You Feel the Beat: The Lisa Lisa Story is a biographical musical drama television film that premiered on Lifetime on February 1, 2025. The film chronicles the life and career of Lisa Velez, professionally known as Lisa Lisa, a pioneering figure in the Latin-freestyle music genre.

== Synopsis ==
The film delves into Lisa Lisa's ascent from a young dreamer in Hell's Kitchen, New York City to a Latin-freestyle icon. The narrative explores her early days performing at Manhattan's Funhouse club, her audition with the production team Full Force, and the formation of Lisa Lisa and Cult Jam. The film also addresses the obstacles she faced, including industry exploitation and the struggle for creative control, while emphasizing the importance of resilience and supportive relationships in her life.

== Cast ==
- Lisa Velez as Lisa's mother
- Jearnest Corchado as Lisa Lisa
- Bre-Z as Toni Ménage
- Matt Borlenghi as Barry Conner
- Maurice P. Kerry as Toni's father
- Ian Lyons as an oncologist
- Angie Martinez as Nurse Rodriguez
- Alijah Kai as Brit
- Eric Diaz as Jellybean
- Giovanni Cristoff as Javi
- Jack Lafferty as Cutty Mac
- Kelly Walling as Mindy
- Bryan Arion as Eladio
- Isaias Alexander Miranda as Spanador
- Omari Elmakki as Guy

== Production ==
The biopic was executive produced by Lisa Lisa (who stars in the film as her own mother), alongside her manager, Toni Menage.
