= USS Anchorage (LPD-23) =

US Navy amphibious transport dock ship

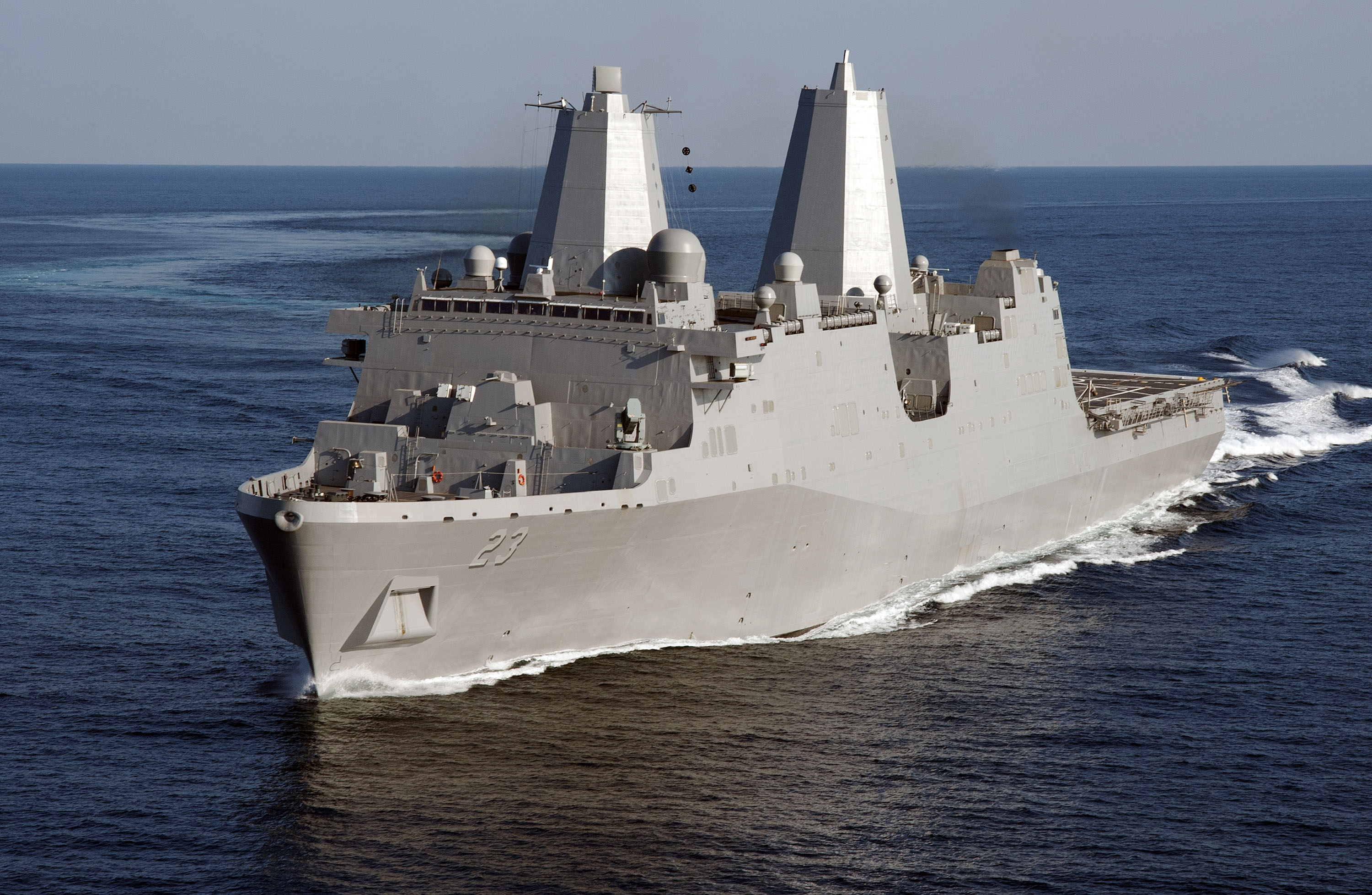
- USS Anchorage on 15 May 2012

History

United States
- Name: Anchorage
- Namesake: Anchorage
- Awarded: 1 June 2006
- Builder: Northrop Grumman Ship Systems, Avondale
- Laid down: 24 September 2007
- Launched: 12 February 2011
- Christened: 14 May 2011
- Acquired: 17 September 2012
- Commissioned: 4 May 2013
- Home port: San Diego
- Identification: MMSI number: 369970637; Callsign: NANC; Pennant number: LPD-23
- Motto: NIL FATO RELINQUEMUS; (WE LEAVE NOTHING TO CHANCE)
- Status: in active service, as of 2016
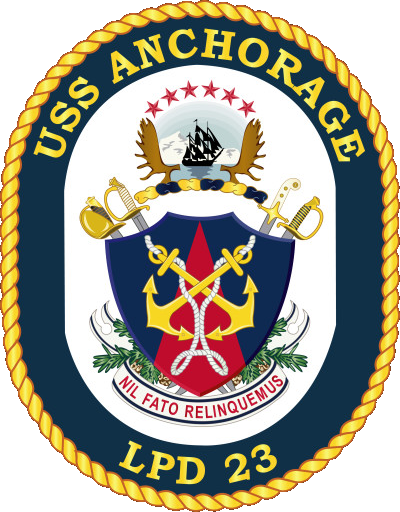
- Badge

General characteristics
- Class & type: San Antonio-class amphibious transport dock
- Displacement: 25,000 long tons (25,000 t) full
- Length: 684 ft (208 m) oa; 661 ft (201 m) wl
- Beam: 105 ft (32 m)
- Draft: 23 ft (7.0 m)
- Installed power: 4 × Colt-Pielstick diesel engines; 40,000 hp (30 MW)
- Propulsion: 2 × single reversing reduction gears; 2 × inboard rotating fixed pitch propellers
- Speed: 22 kn (41 km/h; 25 mph)
- Boats & landing craft carried: 2 × LCACs (air cushion); or 1 × LCU (conventional)
- Troops: 66 officers, 625 enlisted
- Complement: 33 officers, 411 enlisted
- Sensors & processing systems: AN/SPS-48E; AN/SPQ-9B; AN/SPS-73
- Electronic warfare & decoys: AN/SLQ-25A NIXIE; AN/SLQ-32Q(V)2; MK 36 SRBOC; MK 53 / NULKA
- Armament: 1 × Mk 41 16 cell VLS; 2 × Mk31 Mod0 RAM launchers; 2 × 30 mm (1.2 in) Mk46 Mod1 chain guns; 2 × Mk 26 Mod17 .50 cal machine guns
- Aircraft carried: Hangar: 1 × CH-53E Super Stallion; or 2 × CH-46 Sea Knights; or 1 × MV-22 Osprey; or 3 × UH-1Y Venoms/AH-1J SeaCobras; Landing: 2 × CH-53E Super Stallions; or 4 × UH-1Y Venoms/AH-1J SeaCobras; or 4 × CH-46 Sea Knights; or 2 × MV-22 Ospreys; or 1 × AV-8B Harrier

USS Anchorage (LPD-23) is a San Antonio-class amphibious transport dock and the second ship of the United States Navy to be named after the U.S. city of Anchorage, Alaska.

== Construction ==
Anchorage's keel was laid down on 24 September 2007, at the Avondale Shipyard near New Orleans, Louisiana, then owned by Northrop Grumman Ship Systems. The ship was launched on 12 February 2011.; sponsored by Mrs. Annette Conway, wife of James T. Conway, a former Commandant of the Marine Corps. She was christened two months later, on 14 May – the first ship christened by Huntington Ingalls Industries since Northrop Grumman spun off its shipbuilding divisions as a separate company. The ship was formally delivered and accepted by the U.S. Navy on 17 September 2012. Anchorage was commissioned 4 May 2013, in her eponymous city.

== Service history ==
=== Deployments ===
- 11 May 2015 – 15 December 2015: Maiden deployment
- 10 July 2018 – 1 March 2019: Western Pacific
- 08 November 2022 - 08 June 2023: Western Pacific

==== Recovering Orion space capsules for NASA ====
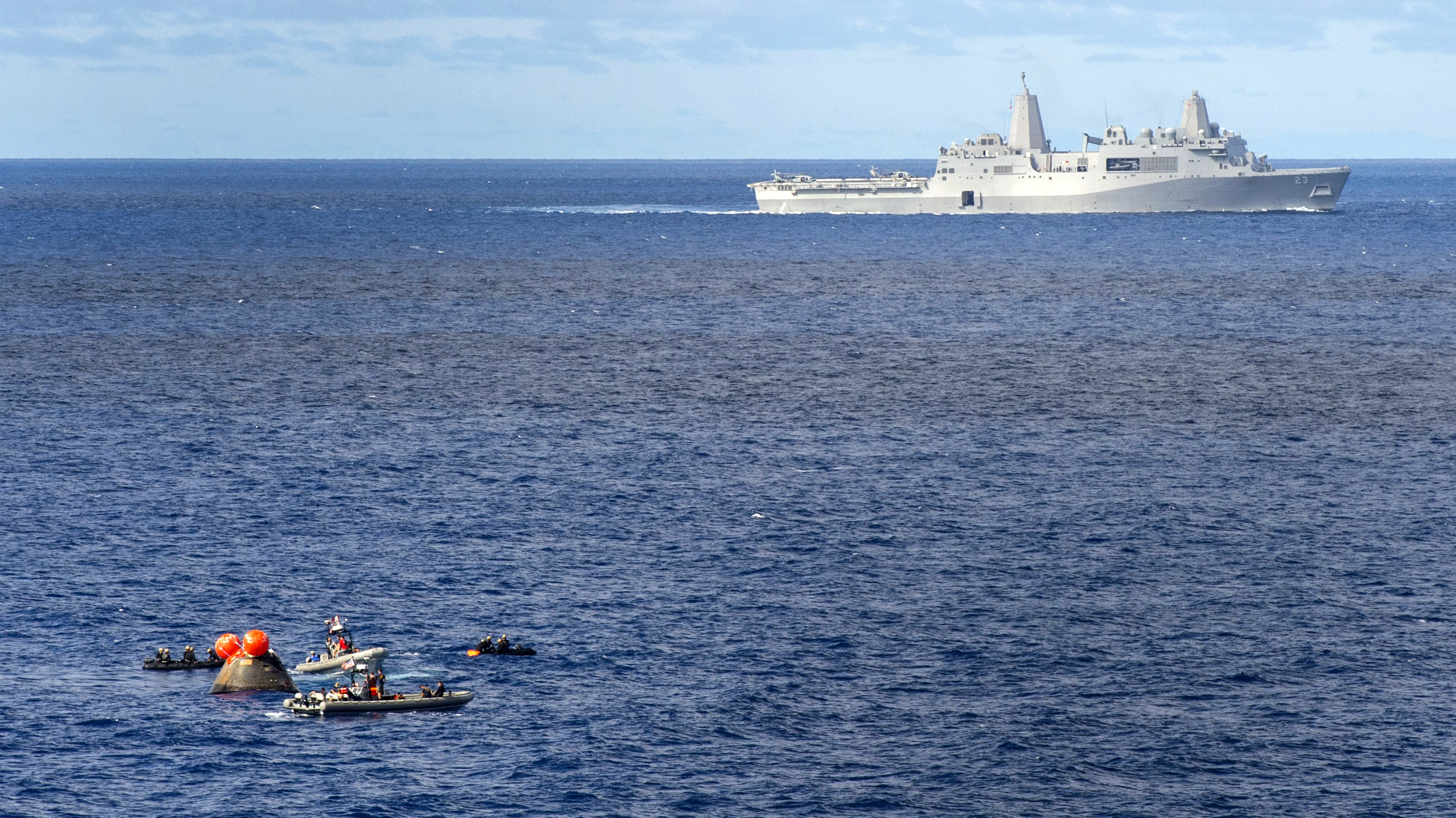
Anchorage with the Orion space capsule, 5 December 2014.

In early August 2014, Anchorage participated in Underway Recovery Test 2, rehearsing scenarios for recovering an Orion space capsule.

Senior project managers from the National Aeronautics and Space Administration (NASA), who oversaw the Exploration Flight Test 1 (EFT-1) for the uncrewed Orion spacecraft, conferred with Rear Admiral Fernandez L. Ponds, commander Expeditionary Strike Group (ESG) 3, and Captain William R. Grotewold, the ship's commanding officer, on board San Diego at her home port of San Diego, 12 September 2013. They discussed plans to retrieve Orion's space capsule during her splashdown in a scheduled test off the coast of Southern California.

"We had a chance to display the ship's capability, show the crew's enthusiasm and demonstrate that our amphibious capability is multi-dimensional, just one more thing that our Navy can do," Ponds explained. "The LPD 17-class ships have one of the most robust command and control communications systems in our Navy inventory."

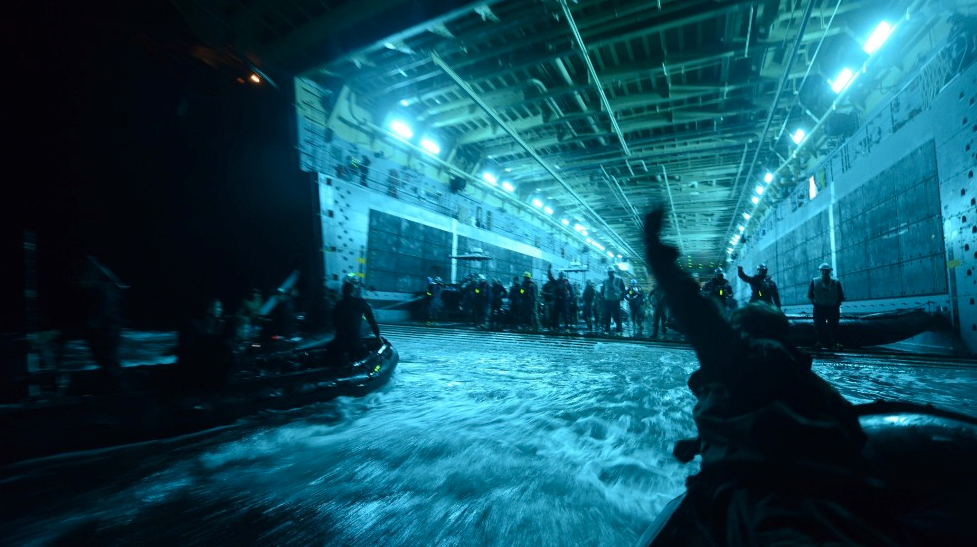
In 2014, sailors assigned to Explosive Ordnance Disposal Mobile Unit (EODMU) 1 and divers from New Zealand, the Netherlands, Canada, Japan, Australia and Chile recover their boats into the well deck of the amphibious transport dock Anchorage after conducting night dive exercises off the coast of San Diego during Rim of the Pacific (RIMPAC).

The space agency's planners intended Orion to reach an altitude of nearly 3,600 mi (5,800 km) above the Earth's surface during EFT-1. Following the test flight, she was to reenter the atmosphere at a speed of more than 20,000 mph (32,000 km/h) and splashdown in the Pacific. The flight was to test the capsule's avionics, heat shield, and parachutes, and the Navy was tasked to locate and recover the craft.

"NASA did a trade study whether they wanted Orion to land on the ground or in the water," Andy Quiett, Detachment 3 deputy operations lead for the Orion program and Department of Defense (DoD) liaison for NASA said, "and because of the size, weight and the deep space requirements of the vehicle, they determined it needed to land in water." Orion's life support, propulsion, thermal protection, and avionics systems enable the spacecraft to extend the duration of her deep space missions, as part of the goal to eventually land on Mars.

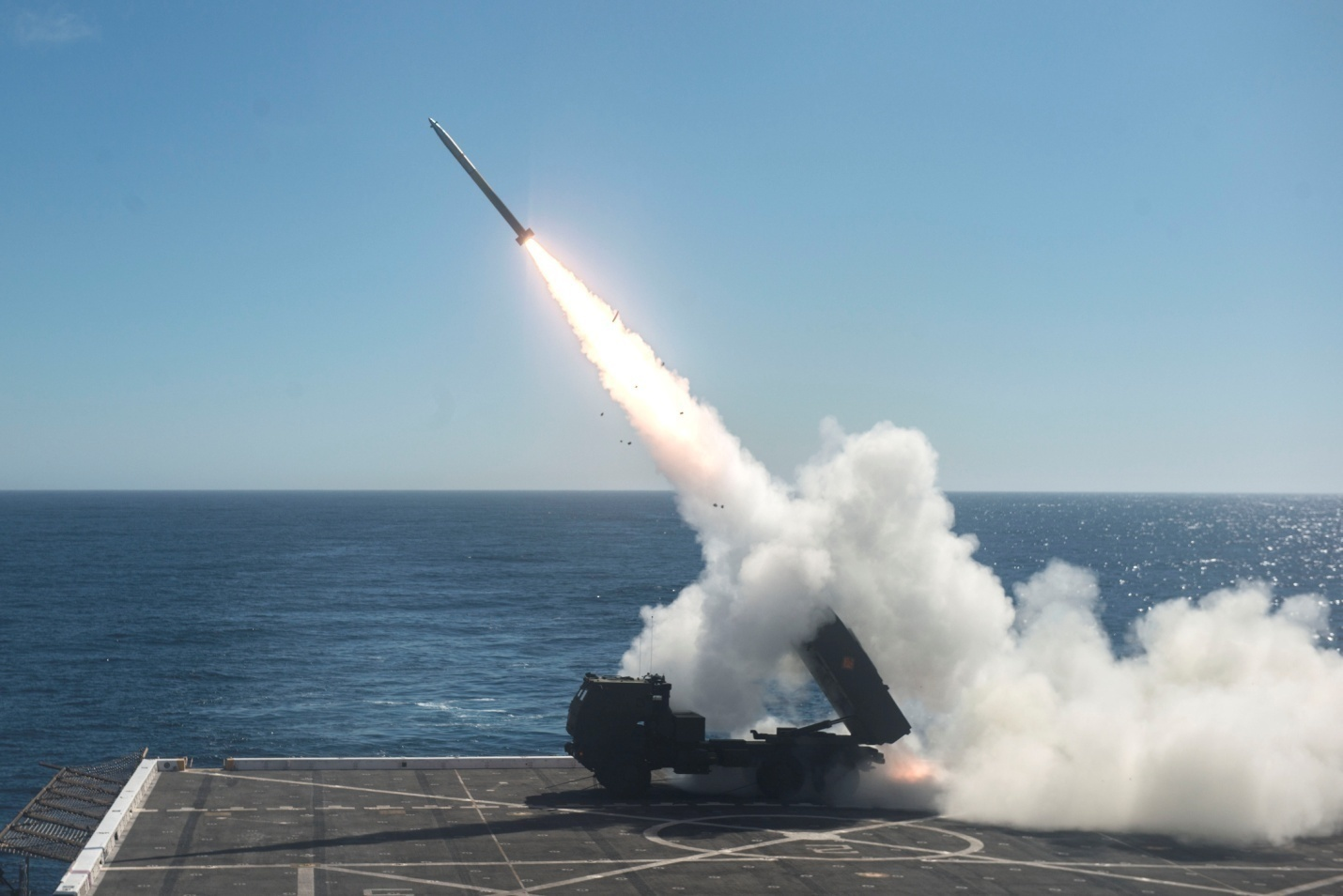
A HIMARS firing from the deck of USS Anchorage during an exercise.

NASA marked a major milestone in the agency's program to reestablish America's crewed space program when it carried out EFT-1 with Orion on 5 December 2014. Orion launched atop a Delta IV rocket from Space Launch Complex 37B at the Cape Canaveral Air Force Station, Florida, made two orbits of the planet during a four and a half hour mission, and splashed down in the Pacific. Anchorage, Military Sealift Command-crewed salvage ship Salvor, Helicopter Sea Combat Squadron 8 (HSC-8), EODMU-11, Mobile Diving and Salvage Company 11–17, Fleet Weather Center San Diego, and Fleet Combat Camera Pacific took part in the recovery when the spacecraft splashed down. Anchorage recovered Orion's crew module, forward bay cover, and parachutes. A bridge team especially trained for the operation maneuvered Anchorage alongside Orion, and lowered small boats to retrieve her. Divers attached lines from the small boats to guide the capsule toward Anchorage, where a NASA-designed winch hauled the module into the well deck.
