= Jean-Baptiste Matho =

French composer

Jean-Baptiste Matho (16 March 1663 – 16 March 1743) was a French composer of the Baroque era. Born in Montfort-sur-Meu near Rennes in the Province of Brittany, his name was originally M. F. H. Thomassin. His name is first mentioned in the Mercure galant of August 1687. As a child, Matho attracted attention for the quality of his singing voice and he was sent to Versailles where he began a career as one of the king's musicians. In October 1699 the Mercure mentioned a performance in the royal apartments at Fontainebleau of the opera Coronis, though ‘neither the king nor their British Majesties heard the music which was judged to be most beautiful’. In 1720, he became Master of the King's Music and was charged with the musical education of the young Louis XV alongside François Couperin and Jean-Joseph Mouret. He wrote several works for the stage, including the tragédie en musique Arion (1714) as well as ballets and other divertissements. Sources. Matho seemed to have retained his position in the royal chapel until his death. His daughter Andrée Denise was granted a pension of 400 livres in consideration of his work in the king’s service. Contemporaneous accounts of Matho’s works are unanimously positive, sometimes overflowing with praise.

- Le magazine de l'opéra baroque by Jean-Claude-Brenac (in French)
