= Project Orion =

Project Orion may refer to:

- Project Orion (nuclear propulsion), a U.S. Air Force study for a nuclear-powered spacecraft
- Orion (laser), built in the UK to research thermonuclear explosions
- Orion (spacecraft), part of NASA's Artemis program
- Project Orion, the code name for the sequel to the video game Cyberpunk 2077; see Cyberpunk 2
- Project Orion was Kodak's internal code name for the development effort launched in 1996 that created the Advanced Photo System (APS) and Advantix film line

== See also ==
- Orion (disambiguation)
