= Orion the Hunter =

Orion the Hunter may refer to:

- Orion (mythology)
- Orion (astronomy), a constellation representing the mythological Orion
- Orion the Hunter (band)
  - Orion the Hunter (album), the eponymous debut album by Orion the Hunter

== See also ==
- Orion (disambiguation)
- Hunter (disambiguation)
