= Orion (name) =

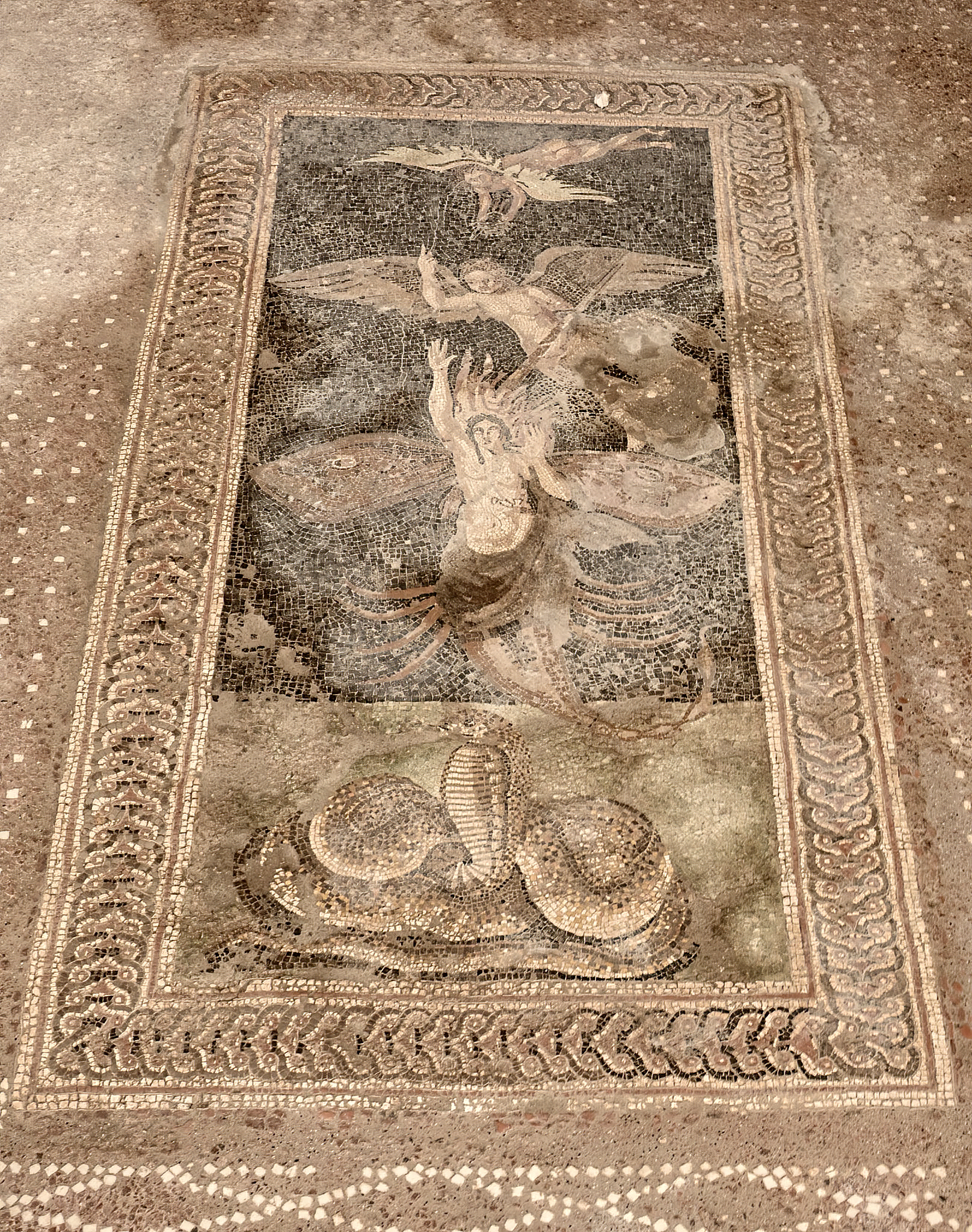
- A mosaic depicting the transformation of the hunter, Orion, into the constellation, by the will of Zeus.
- Gender: Primarily male, Unisex(Japanese)

Origin
- Origin: Greek, Japanese
- Meaning: Name taken from Greek myth. Various(Japanese)

Orion is both a surname and a male given name usually derived from the character from Greek mythology or the constellation named for the character. The name has increased in usage in recent years along with other mythological names. Notable persons with that name include:

This name is pronounced as 織音, 流星, etc. in Japan and is considered a gender-neutral name.

== People with the surname ==
- Agustín Orión (born 1981), Argentine football player
- Alexandre Orion (born 1978), Brazilian artist
- Ezra Orion (1934–2015), Israeli artist

== People with the given name ==
- Orion of Thebes (died c. 460), grammarian scholar in Ancient Egypt
- Orion M. Barber (1857–1930), American politician from Vermont
- Orion Ben, British actress
- Orion H. Cheney (1869–1939), American lawyer and banker
- Orion Clemens (1825–1897), American politician and brother of Mark Twain
- Orion R. Farrar (1866–1929), American composer
- Orion Gallin (1928–2021), Israeli discus thrower
- Orion Hindawi (born 1980), American software entrepreneur and billionaire
- Orion P. Howe (1848–1930), American drummer boy and Medal of Honor recipient
- Orion Martin (born 1985), American football player
- Orion Samuelson (born 1934), American broadcaster
- Orion Story, American drag queen
- Orion Weiss (born 1981), American pianist
- Orion Simprini (born 1974), lead singer of American band The Orion Experience
- Orion Kerkering (born 2001), American Major League Baseball pitcher for the Philadelphia Phillies

== See also ==
- Orion (disambiguation)
