= USS Orion =

USS Orion is a name used more than once by the U.S. Navy:

- USS Orion (1861), a wooden schooner used as part of the Stone Fleet of the Union Navy during the American Civil War.
- USS Orion (1869), a single-turreted, twin-screw monitor of the Union Navy during the American Civil War, the name used only briefly (2 months) following the original vessel name USS Chimo (1864). The vessel was later named the Piscataqua (1869).
- USS Orion (AC-11), a collier commissioned at Norfolk, Virginia, 29 July 1912.
- USS Orion (AS-18), a submarine tender commissioned 30 September 1943.

== See also ==
- Orion was the name of the Lunar Module on Apollo 16
- Project Orion (nuclear propulsion), proposed U.S. spaceship-type
- Orion (ship), various ships named Orion
