= Orion 2 =

Orion 2 or Orion-2 may refer to:

- Orion 2, a space telescope flown in 1973 aboard the Soyuz 13 spacecraft
- Orión-2, a sounding rocket from Argentina, used from 1966 to 1971
- Orion 2, a communications satellite launched in 1999, later renamed Telstar 12
- Orion capsule space mission 2, formerly the Exploration Mission 1, Artemis 1
- Mission Orion 2 of the cancelled Constellation program, see List of Constellation missions

== See also ==
- 2 Orionis, a star in the Constellation Orion
