= USS Orion (1861) =

USS Orion (1861), a wooden schooner, was purchased by the Union Navy during the American Civil War at Baltimore, Maryland, on 13 August 1861.

She was purchased to be used in the "Stone Fleet" to be sunk as an obstruction blocking channels leading to Southern ports.

She was sunk in the North Carolina sounds in the fall of 1861.

== See also ==
- Union blockade
