= Orion Records =

Orion Records was a primarily classical record label active from the late 1960s until 1988. It grew out of an earlier, Canadian label, Baroque Records, founded by former Everest Records executive Giveon Cornfield. After subsuming portions of Baroque's catalogue, Orion specialized in recording promising young artists; some, such as harpsichordist-organist Kenneth Gilbert and clarinetist Richard Stoltzman, went on to significant recording careers for larger labels.

Taking advantage of personal connections, Cornfield secured for Orion an association with the Menuhin Foundation, improving the label's access to retail channels, and arranged for distribution by Everest. Orion's catalogue would eventually list some 600 titles, and the label had its share of awards—several Grand Prix du Disques, two "Recordings of Special Merit" from Stereo Review, and the Grand Prix International du Disque Liszt 1977-but sales were small, generally less than 25 copies of any given title annually, and the company relied on financial infusions from Cornfield to remain in business. An exception was one of the label's rare non-classical issues, a collection of torch songs recorded by Anita Ellis; with a few thousand copies sold, it was the label's most successful release. Due to conflict with other firms using the name Orion, the firm's name was changed to ORION MASTER RECORDINGS, LLC.

As the compact disc decimated the market for conventional records, in 1988 Cornfield opted to retire rather than retool the company's output for the digital era. He donated the Orion archives to the University of Hawaii with the proviso he could reissue recordings at will. The bulk of Orion's archives are being reactivated (streaming) on two Naxos web sites: ClassicsOnLine.com and NaxosMusicLibrary.com. Currently (November 2014) over 750 Orion albums are now available on the Naxos websites.
