= HMS Orion =

Seven ships of the British Royal Navy have been named HMS Orion, after the hunter Orion of Greek mythology:

- HMS Orion (1787) was a 74-gun third-rate ship of the line launched in 1787 and broken up in 1814.
- HMS Orion (1854) was an 80-gun second-rate screw ship launched in 1854 and broken up in 1867.
- HMS Orion (1879) was an armoured corvette built for the Ottoman Empire but purchased by the Royal Navy in 1878 and launched in 1879. She was converted to a depot ship and renamed HMS Orontes in 1909, and was sold in 1913.
- HMS Orion was to have been an armoured cruiser. She was projected in 1904 but never built.
- HMS Orion (1910) was an Orion-class battleship launched in 1910 and sold in 1922.
- HMS Orion (85) was a Leander-class light cruiser launched in 1932 and sold in 1949.
- Orion was a French submarine seized in 1940, laid up until 1943 and then broken up.

== Battle honours ==
- First of June 1794
- Groix Island 1795
- St Vincent 1797
- Nile 1801
- Trafalgar 1805
- Baltic 1855
- Jutland 1916
- Atlantic 1939
- Calabria 1940
- Mediterranean 1940-44
- Malta Convoys 1941
- Matapan 1941
- Greece 1941
- Crete 1941
- Sicily 1943
- Salerno 1943
- Aegean 1944
- Anzio 1944
- Normandy 1944
- South France 1944

== See also ==
- HSwMS Orion, two ships of the Swedish Navy
- HMAS Orion was an Oberon-class submarine of the Royal Australian Navy launched in 1974 and decommissioned and laid up in 1996.
- Orion (ship), various ships named Orion
