= Arion Gesangverein =

German American musical organization

Arion Gesangverein is a German American musical organization.

== History ==
It was founded in 1850. It was one of several important cultural organizations created beginning in the late 1840s, which helped German culture survive and disseminate after a wave of immigration to the United States. It claims to be "one of the oldest singing societies in the United States". It was named after the Greek poet-musician Arion.

Arion performs regularly in the Baltimore and Washington areas. The group has also performed at a reception honoring Ludwig Kossuth and at the dedication of the Gettysburg National Cemetery. Arion Gesangverein has continued to perform at the Gettysburg Cemetery's anniversaries, most recently in 1988.

== Awards ==
In 1950, the organization won the Zelter-Plakette award, given out by the Deutscher Saengerbund.
