= HSwMS Orion =

At least two ships of the Swedish Navy have been named HSwMS Orion,

- HSwMS Orion (1903), a torpedo boat
- HSwMS Orion (A201), a signals intelligence gathering vessel launched in 1984

== See also ==
- HMS Orion
