= Arion (software) =

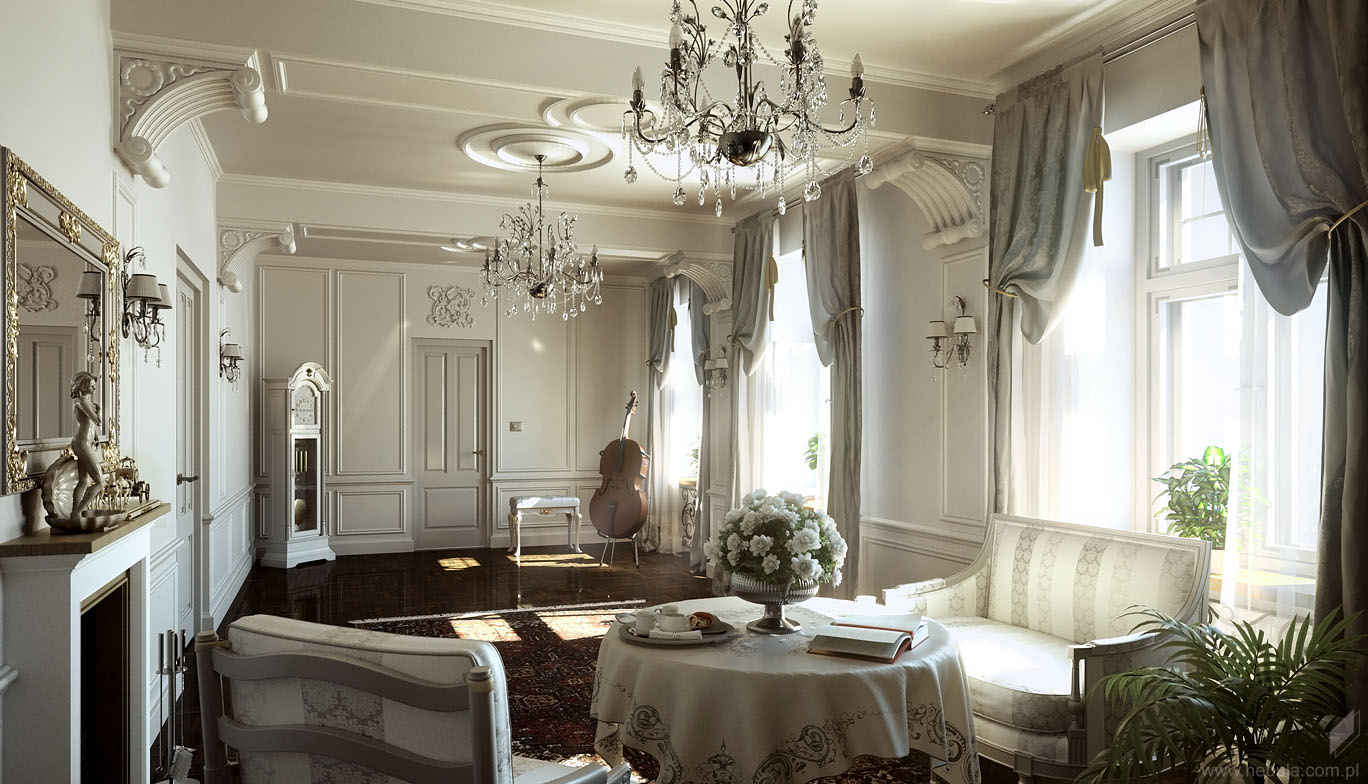
- Render by Marcin Jastrzebski using Arion
- Developer(s): RandomControl
- Initial release: 9 July 2008; 16 years ago
- Stable release: 2.7.0 / 20 December 2014; 10 years ago
- Operating system: Windows XP Professional x64 Edition and Windows Vista
- Platform: CUDA, IA-32 and x86-64
- Available in: English
- Type: Raytracer
- License: Proprietary commercial software
- Website: www.randomcontrol.com/arion

Arion is a physically based, unbiased render engine developed by RandomControl.

== Versions ==
Arion standalone is a general purpose rendering tool with a visual UI. There are also versions that integrate into 3ds Max and Rhinoceros.

== See also ==
- POV-Ray - A historical raytracer.
- Octane Render - A commercial unbiased GPU-accelerated renderer.
- Sunflow - An open source unbiased renderer.
