= Arion (Matho) =

Arion is an opera by the French composer Jean-Baptiste Matho, first performed at the Académie Royale de Musique (the Paris Opera) on 10 April 1714. It takes the form of a tragédie en musique in a prologue and five acts. The libretto, by Louis Fuzelier, is based on the Greek myth of the poet Arion.

== Sources ==
- (in French) "Libretto at "Livres baroques"".
- (in French) "Félix Clément and Pierre Larousse Dictionnaire des Opéras, Paris, 1881".
