= Orion (system-on-a-chip) =

Orion is a system-on-a-chip manufactured by Marvell Technology Group and used in network-attached storage. Based on the ARMv5TE architecture, it has on-chip support for Ethernet, SATA and USB, and is used in hardware made by Hewlett-Packard and D-Link among others. It is supported by the Lenny release of Debian GNU/Linux.
