= Bryan Arion =

Mexican actor and model

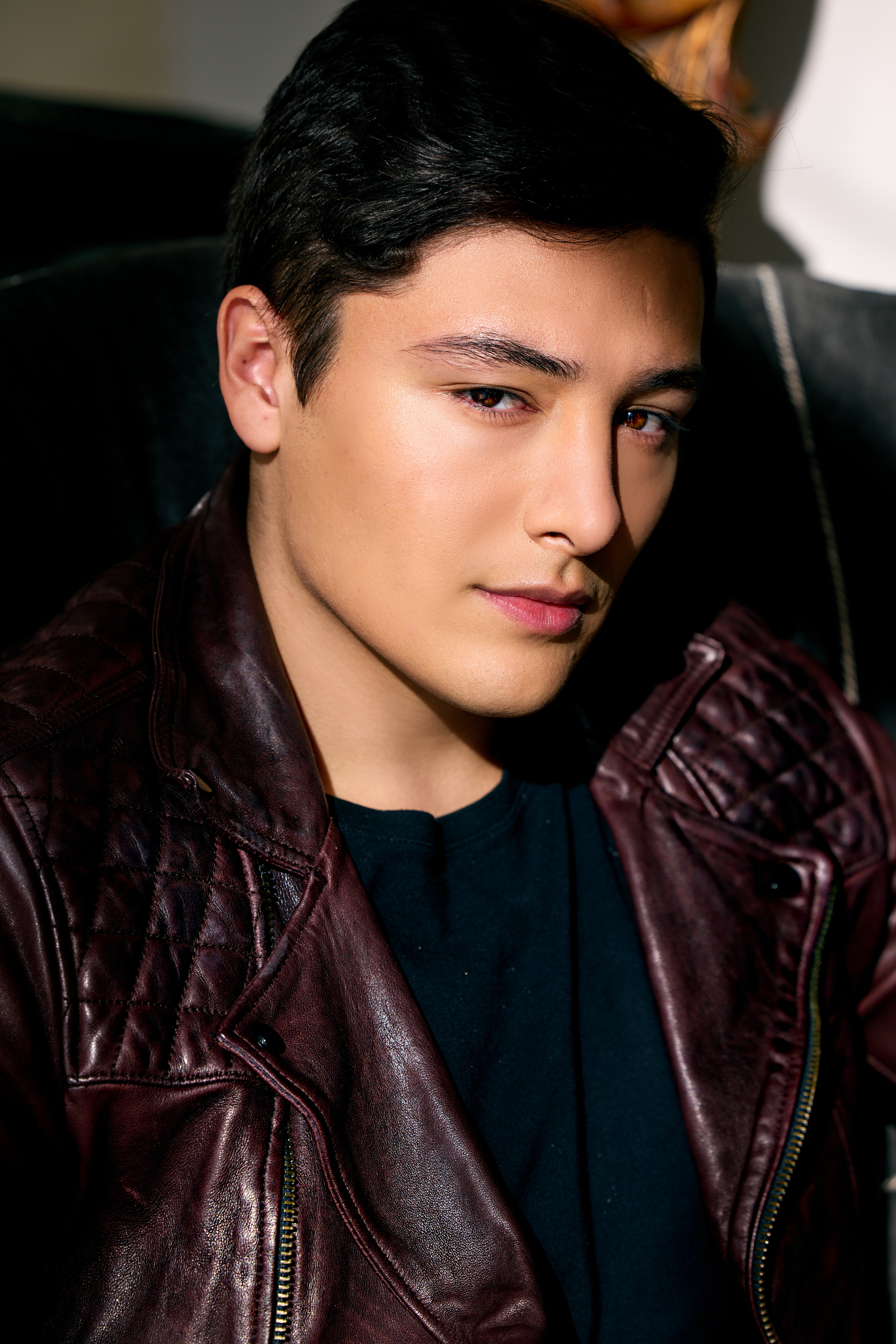
- Occupations: Actor, Model

Bryan Arion is a Mexican actor and model best known for his roles in television series Selena: The Series, The Last Ship, and the film Can You Feel the Beat: The Lisa Lisa Story.

== Early life ==
Arion was born in Chilpancingo, Guerrero, Mexico, a city known for its drug cartels. His family was a victim of cartel-related violence so at age 5 he and his mother fled to the US. He grew up in North Carolina where he experienced racism and bullying because of his ethnicity.

== Career ==
Arion booked one of his first roles on the soap opera Days of Our Lives. He also went on to appear in the action-drama series The Last Ship. Arion starred as Ray in Selena: The Series, which was released in 2020.

In 2025, he appeared in the Lifetime movie Can You Feel the Beat: The Lisa Lisa Story as Eladio.

He has also appeared in commercials.

== Personal life ==
Arion is a practitioner of Brazilian Jiu-Jitsu and Muay Thai. Arion is also a musician who plays guitar and piano.

== Filmography ==
| Year | Title | Role | Notes | Ref. |
|---|---|---|---|---|
| 2015 | Web Atlas | Sparrow, Marcus, Chico, Tom, Lance | TV series | |
| 2015 | Warzone | Sparrow | TV series | |
| 2016 | Days of Our Lives | Communal Kid | TV series | |
| 2016 | Blacked Out | Paul | Short film | |
| 2018 | The Last Ship | Yeonis Estrada | TV series | |
| 2019 | Instant Crush | Ernesto Alvarez | TV series | |
| 2020 | Mijo | Papa | Short film | |
| 2020 | Selena: The Series | Ray | TV series | |
| 2023 | These Foos | Brock | Film | |
| 2025 | Can You Feel the Beat: The Lisa Lisa Story | Eladio | Film | |
