= Ruth Arion =

German-Israeli painter (1912–1998)

- Born: 17 June 1912; Breslau, Germany
- Died: 15 November 1998 (aged 86); Ein Hod, Israel

Ruth Arion (17 June 1912 – 15 November 1998) was a German-Israeli painter and enamel artist and one of the founders of Ein Hod Artists’ Village. Her works reflect her experiences as she moved from place to place in the Land of Israel from the 1930s through the 1990s.

== Biography ==
Arion was born as Evelina Grüntal in Breslau, Germany (now Wrocław, Poland). Her father, Leo Grüntal, was a fashion designer and owned a fashion store in the city. In 1931, she began to study art and medicine at the University of Breslau. In 1933, after the Nazis came to power in Germany, Grüntal emigrated to Mandatory Palestine. Aged 22, she initially settled in Haifa, studying with the ceramicist Hedwig Grossman and the sculptor Rudi Lehman. She later joined Kibbutz Gesher, and subsequently lived in Kibbutz Mishmar HaEmek, Haifa and Jerusalem. Between 1938 and 1948, she completed her art studies at Bezalel Academy of Art and Design in Jerusalem, where she studied with Ludwig Johannes, Jacob Steinhardt and Mordecai Ardon. She also studied in Jerusalem with the painter Edward Matuszczak.

In the late 1940s, she settled in Jaffa, studying drawing with Marcel Janco. Influenced by Janco's conviction that art must be combined with craftwork, Arion began to study enamel Vitreous enamel and was the first artist in Israel to produce abstract enamel works. Her enamel works decorated educational institutions throughout the country.

Arion was married to the journalist and art lover Moshe Dagan (1909-1973) until his death.

In 1958, Arion joined a group of artists headed by Marcel Janco that established Ein Hod Artists’ Village, where she lived until her death. In 1960, she participated in specialist training in industrial work with enamel at the Gustavsberg factory in Sweden. In 1970, the Israeli Ministry of Education chose Arion as a guest artist at the Cité internationale des arts in Paris, where she studied calligraphy and Korean sumi painting with the Korean artist Ung Nu Li.

During the course of her career, Arion held numerous solo exhibitions in Israel and several in other countries. She died in Ein Hod in 1998, aged 86.

== Solo exhibitions ==
- 1946 - Yunnes Gallery, Jerusalem
- 1950 – Katz Gallery, Tel Aviv
- 1960– Chemerinski Art Gallery, Tel Aviv
- 1963 – Woodstock Gallery, London – oils and enamels
- 1964 – Rodin Gallery, Cape Town
- 1969 – 1969 – Saga Molin Gallery, Hallagarden, Sweden, watercolors
- 1970 – Nora Art Gallery, Jerusalem
- 1971 – Old Jaffa Gallery, jaffa
- 1973 – Rotschild House, Haifa - Enemels
- 1974 – Cité Internationale des Arts Paris
- 1981 – Municipal Museum of Ramat Gan – multi media exhibition
- 1987 – Villa Clementine, Wiesbaden – multi media exhibition
- 1988 – Waldersdort Gallery, Trier
- 1991 – Artists House, Tel Aviv
- 1996 – Janco Dada Museum
- 1999 – Ein Hod artists Gallery

== Group exhibitions ==
- 1954 – Jerusalem Artists House
- 1958 - Artists House, Haifa
- 1962 – Tel Aviv Museum of Art
- 1975 – Israeli Artists in Frankfurt
- 1976 – International Exhibition, San Diego
- 1978 – Bienale enamel, Limoges
- 1978 – Trienale enamel, Tokyo
