= List of Constellation missions =

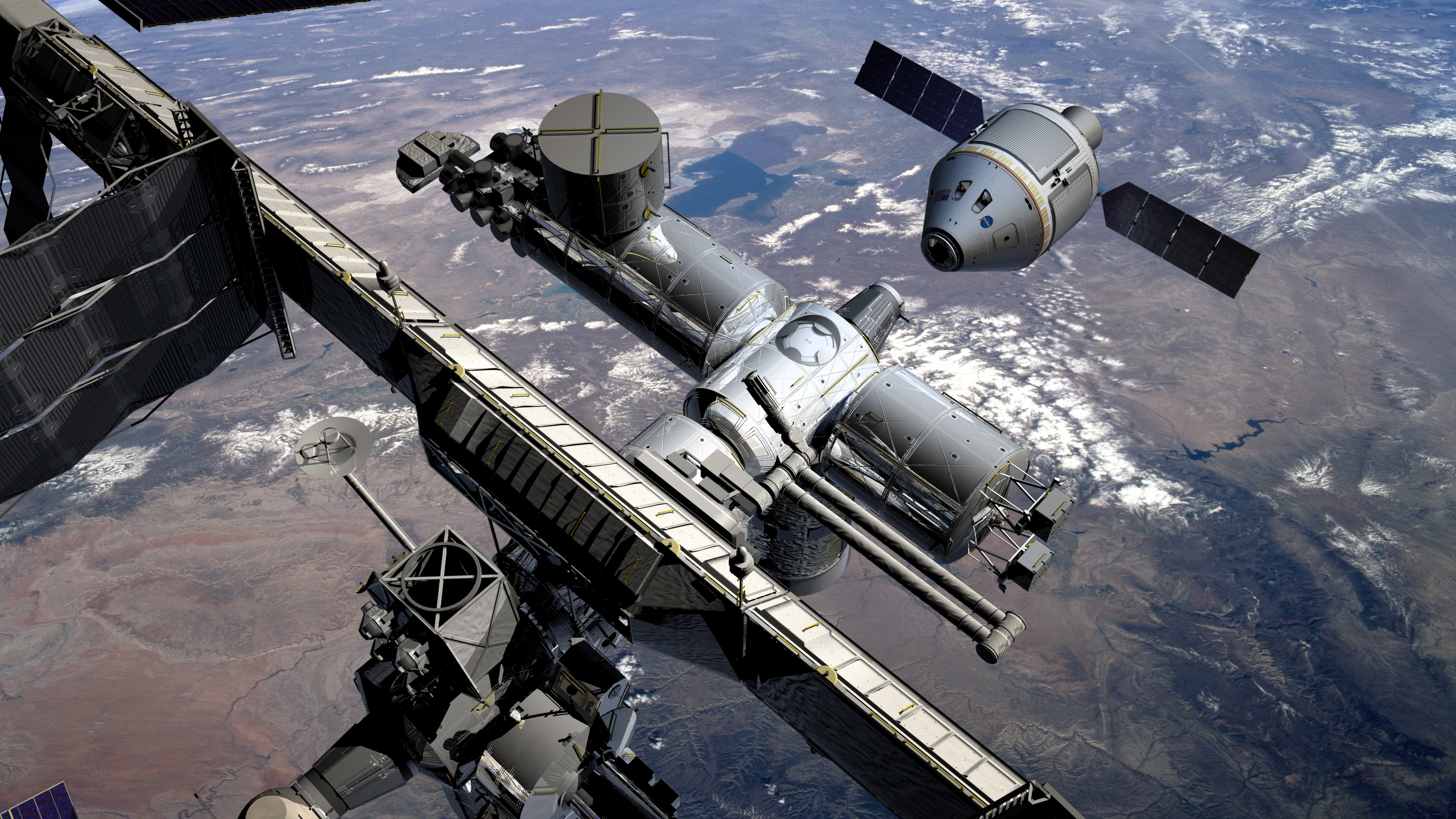
Artist's rendition of the docking of Orion to the ISS

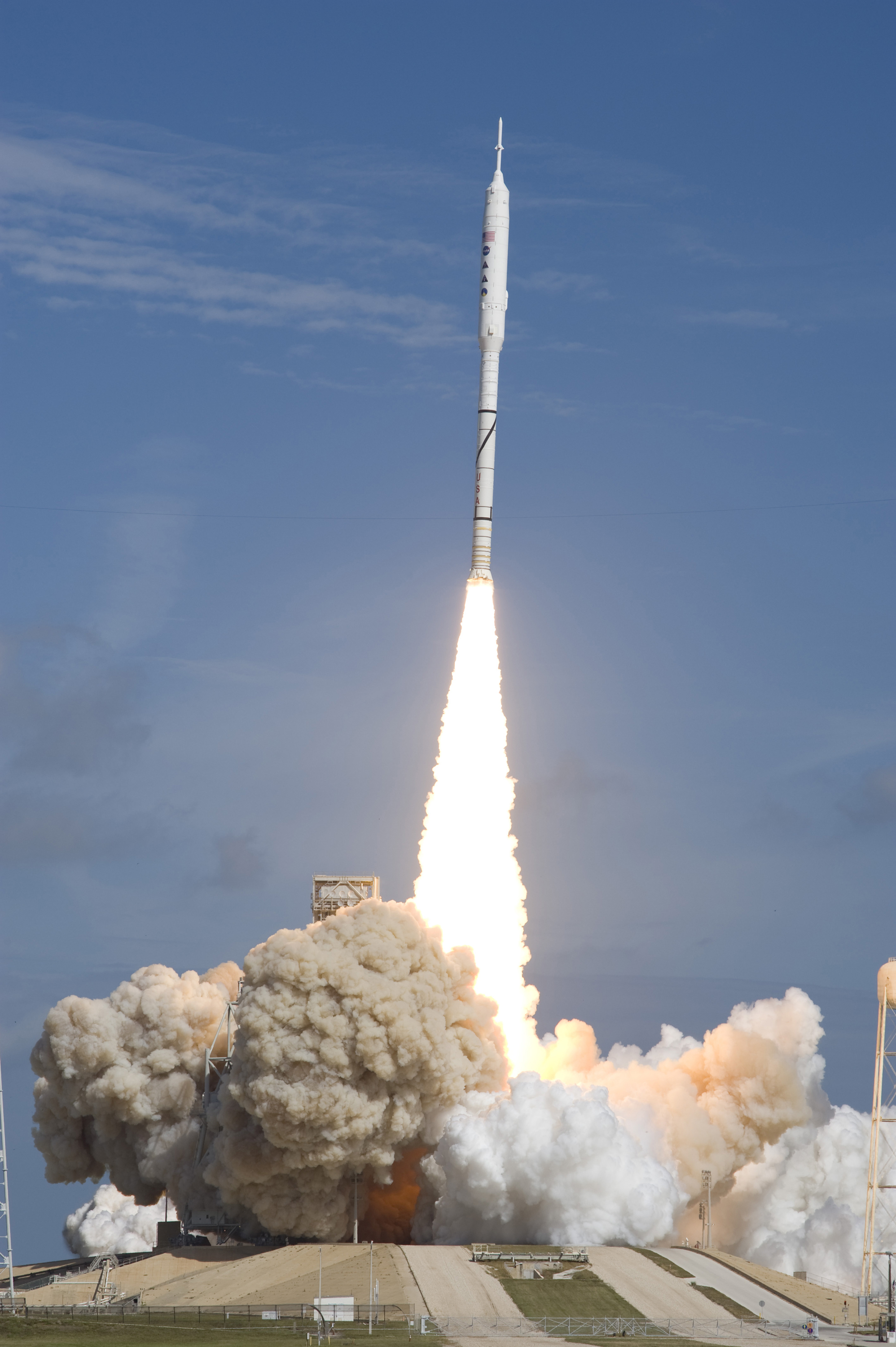
Ares I-X launches from LC-39B, 15:30 UTC, October 28, 2009.

The Constellation Program was NASA's planned future human spaceflight program between 2005 and 2009, which aimed to develop a new crewed spacecraft (Orion) and a pair of launchers (Ares I and Ares V) to continue servicing the International Space Station and return to the Moon.

As of 2009, a single uncrewed suborbital launch test (Ares I-X) had been flown, with crewed missions anticipated to begin between 2014 (when an uncrewed mission was indeed launched) and 2017-2019 (according to the independent Augustine Commission). On February 1, 2010, President Obama announced that he intended to cancel the program with the U.S. 2011 fiscal year budget. A revised proposal in April confirmed that the Orion spacecraft would be retained for future missions beyond low Earth orbit, with the Ares launchers redeveloped into the Space Launch System. However, the Constellation Program itself was cancelled, with low Earth orbit operations transferred to the Commercial Crew Development program, which itself would not begin crewed launches until Crew Dragon Demo-2 in 2020.

== Development of mission plans ==
In October 2006 NASA released a draft schedule of all planned NASA Constellation missions through 2019. This document included descriptions of a series of proposed vehicle test missions. In July 2007 the schedule was reviewed. In January 2008 the schedule was again reviewed. The most recent published set of milestones is from February 2009. Also, an independent assessment by the Review of United States Human Space Flight Plans Committee in October 2009 found that under NASA's then-current plans and budget the Ares I would not be ready to launch until 2017–2019, with the Ares V not available until the late 2020s.

On October 11, 2010, the Constellation program was cancelled, ending development of the Altair, Ares I, and Ares V. The Orion Crew Exploration Vehicle was renamed the Orion Multi-Purpose Crew Vehicle (MPCV), to be launched on the Space Launch System.

== Constellation missions ==
After cancellation, one of the original launches took place anyway. Several more missions similar to Constellation missions would launch under the Orion test program and the following up Artemis program.

Test launches
| Order | Date | Mission | Launch Vehicle | Duration | Crew Size | Launch Pad | Note |
|---|---|---|---|---|---|---|---|
| 1 | October 28, 2009 | Ares I-X | Ares I-X | ~2 min. | Uncrewed | 39B | Atmospheric test of the first stage of the Ares I-X launcher with four active SRM segments and an inert fifth segment and upper stage. Program had already been cancelled by time of launch. |

Planned (cancelled) missions as of 2009
| Order | Year | Mission | Launch Vehicle | Duration | Crew Size | Launch Pad | Notes |
|---|---|---|---|---|---|---|---|
| 2 | 2012 | Ares I-X Prime "Ares 1Y" | Ares I-X Prime "Ares 1Y" | ~8 min. | Uncrewed | 39B | Second sub-orbital Ares I-X test flight, consisting of a five segment booster with real upper stage and a dummy J-2 engine. High altitude abort. |
| 3 | 2014 | Orion 1 | Ares I | | Uncrewed | 39B | First flight of the Orion spacecraft, in an unmanned orbital flight with a splashdown off Australia. NOTE: This test was replaced under the Orion test program as Exploration Flight Test-1 in 2014, using a different mission profile. |
| 4 | 2015 | Orion 2 | Ares I | | Crewed | 39B | First crewed Orion test flight. Includes demonstration of rendezvous and proximity operations with the ISS. First docking with the ISS. Landing at Edwards AFB. Leaves an adapter on the ISS. |
| 5 | 2015 | Orion 3 | Ares I | | Crewed | 39B | Second crewed Orion test flight. Leaves a second adapter on the ISS. |
| 6 | 2015 | Orion 4 | Ares I | | Crewed | 39B | ISS Crew Rotation Flight. First operational Orion flight. |
| 7 | 2016 | Orion 5 | Ares I | | Crewed | 39B | ISS Crew Rotation Flight |
| 8 | 2016 | Orion 6 | Ares I | | Crewed | 39B | ISS Crew Rotation Flight |
| 9 | 2017 | Orion 7 | Ares I | | Crewed | 39B | ISS Crew Rotation Flight |
| 10 | 2017 | Orion 8 | Ares I | | Crewed | 39B | ISS Crew Rotation Flight |
| 11 | 2018 | Orion 9 | Ares I | | Crewed | 39B | ISS Crew Rotation Flight |
| 13 | 2018 | Ares V-Y | Ares V-Y | | Uncrewed | 39A | Maiden flight of Ares V NOTE: This test was replaced under the SLS project and Artemis program as Artemis 1 in 2022, using a different mission profile. |
| 14 | 2018 | Orion 10 | Ares I | | Crewed | 39B | ISS Crew Rotation Flight |
| 15 | 2019 | Altair 1 | Ares V | | Uncrewed | 39A | Maiden flight of Altair. Altair for Orion 11. |
| 16 | 2019 | Orion 11 | Ares I | | Crewed | 39B | |
| 17 | 2019 | Orion 12 | Ares I | | Crewed | 39B | ISS Crew Rotation Flight |
| 18 | 2019 | Altair 2 | Ares V | | Uncrewed | 39A | Altair for Orion 13 |
| 19 | 2019 | Orion 13 | Ares I | | Crewed | 39B | First Orion flight to the Moon |
| 20 | 2019 | Orion 14 | Ares I | | Crewed | 39B | ISS Crew Rotation Flight |
| 21 | 2020 | Altair 3 | Ares V | | Uncrewed | 39A | Altair for Orion 15 |
| 22 | 2020 | Orion 15 | Ares I | | Crewed | 39B | Flight to the Moon |
| 23 | 2020 | Orion 16 | Ares I | | Crewed | 39B | ISS Crew Rotation Flight |
| 24 | 2020 | Altair 4 | Ares V | | Uncrewed | 39A | Direct lunar flight? |
| 25 | 2020 | Orion 17 | Ares I | | Crewed | 39B | ISS Crew Rotation Flight |

== Abort tests ==
These were planned to test the launch escape system of the Orion spacecraft on the launchpad.

| Order | Date | Mission | Note |
|---|---|---|---|
| 1 | May 6, 2010 | Pad Abort-1 | Used the former shape of the LAS adapter. Also known as abort flight test (AFT). The full-scale Orion AFT crew module underwent preparations at Dryden Flight Research Center. Orion Crew Module Pathfinder 'Test Article' fabricated at Langley Research Center. The PA-1 Test took place at U.S. Army's White Sands Missile Range in New Mexico. While originally planned to occur in late 2008, the test slipped to "early 2010". In October 2009 Orbital Sciences indicated the test was scheduled for March 2010. |

== Successor missions ==
Several missions with modified profiles similar to the planned missions were launched after the conclusion of the Constellation program.

Test launches
| Order | Date | Mission | Launch Vehicle | Duration | Crew Size | Launch Pad | Note |
|---|---|---|---|---|---|---|---|
| Former no.3 | December 5, 2014, 12:05 UTC (07:05 EST) | Exploration Flight Test 1 Formerly "Orion-1" | Delta IV Heavy | 4 hours, 24 minutes | Uncrewed | SLC-37B | First flight of the Orion spacecraft, in an uncrewed orbital flight with a splashdown off California. Unlike the original mission 3 (Orion-1) the Delta-IV replaced the Ares-I and a high apogee orbit return was used instead of low Earth orbit. |
| Former no.13 | November 16, 2022, 06:47:44 UTC | Artemis 1 Formerly, "Exploration Mission 1", "Ares V flight 1" | Space Launch System | 25.5 days | Uncrewed | LC-39B | Maiden flight of SLS, the update follow-on to Ares V. The Ares-V development SLS is used in place of the earlier iteration Ares-V, an Orion capsule is included instead of a mass simulator for this test flight, which sends Orion on a test mission around the Moon, that was not part of the mission list for Constellation; which had Orion-13 as the first Moon mission, that was crewed, including lunar landing, on Constellation mission 19. |
