= Orion (1904 ship) =

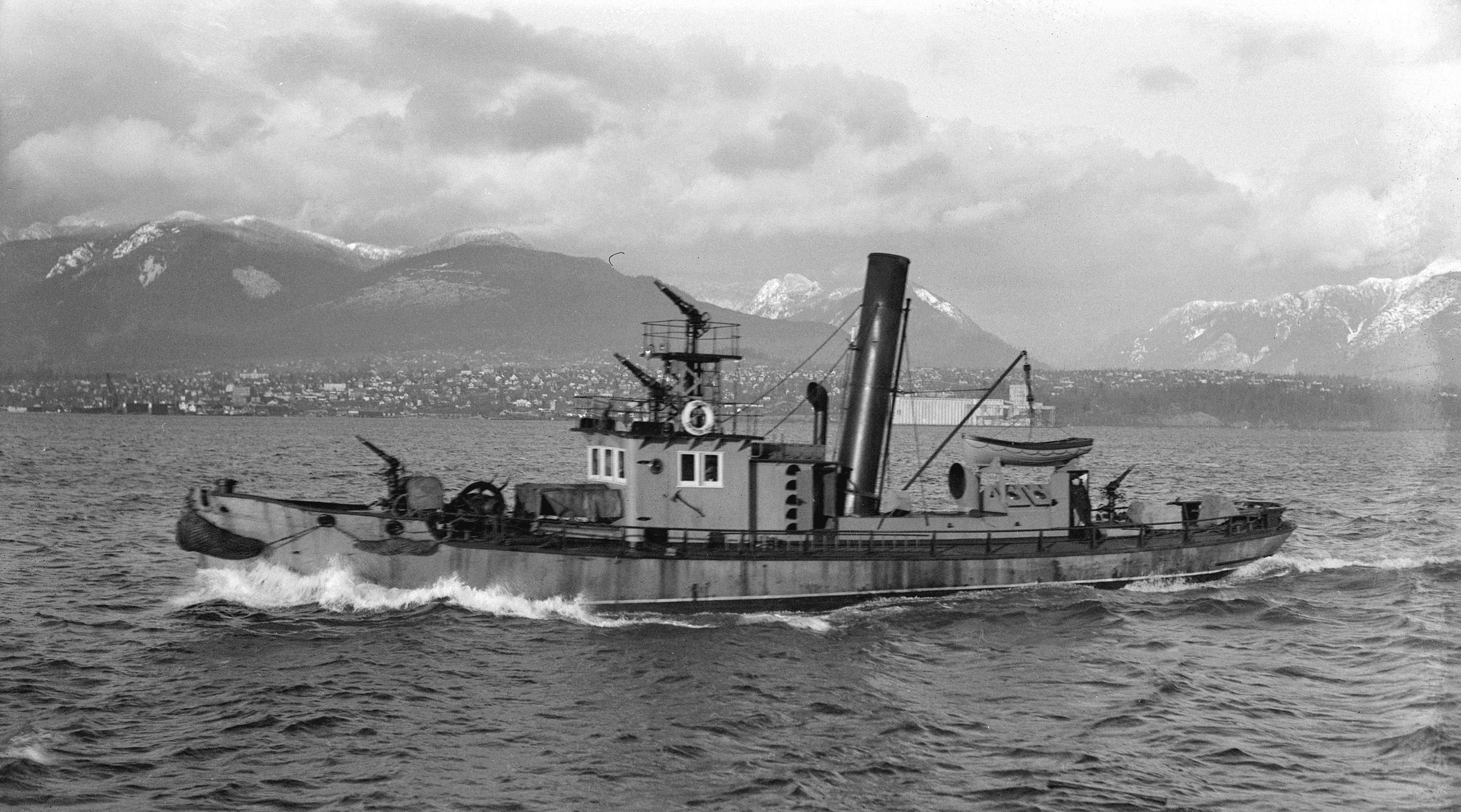
Orion was converted to serve as a fireboat in 1930.

Orion was constructed as a whale catcher in 1904, in Christiania, Norway. She was a steam-powered vessel, 91 feet (28 m) long, 17 feet (5.2 m) wide, displacing 109 tonnes. Robert Lloyd Webb, author of a book on commercial whaling in the Pacific Northwest, wrote that she was the first steam-powered chaser boat in British Columbia.

He recorded that Orion had to ship her whale catching gear in a commercial freighter, because every available space had to be loaded with coal for her long and difficult voyage from Norway, around Cape Horn, to British Columbia.

Orion's first crew, who sailed her from Norway, were Norwegian whalers. Her owners wanted to take advantage of the Norwegian whalers' experience, and invited them to stay in Canada. Canadian fishermen complained that their experience should be ignored, and Canadian seamen should be given first crack at their jobs.

In its initial years of operation her owners considered Orion a great success, harvesting hundreds of whales per year. By 1916, nine other Canadian whalers were working out of British Columbia, and Americans had followed the Canadian example, and the whale stock off the coast of the Pacific Northwest had been devastated. Orion, like most of the other vessels, was repurposed. She was converted to fish halibut.

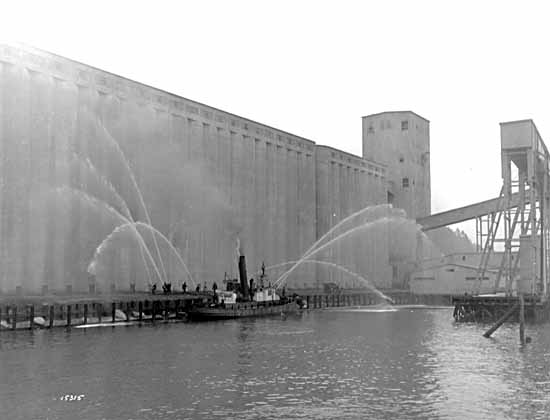
Fireboat Orion Battling a fire at a Vancouver grain elevator in 1932

In 1930 she was converted to serve as a fireboat, serving in Vancouver, British Columbia. The Port of Vancouver's 1933 annual report stated that Orion had responded to 75 alarms. Lea Edgar, a historian at the Vancouver Maritime Museum, wrote in the BC Shipping News, that Orion was "dubious in its effectiveness", and that she was retired, in 1937, and sold for scrap in 1941.
