= Exploration Flight Test-1 =

2014 unmanned test flight of the Orion spacecraft by NASA

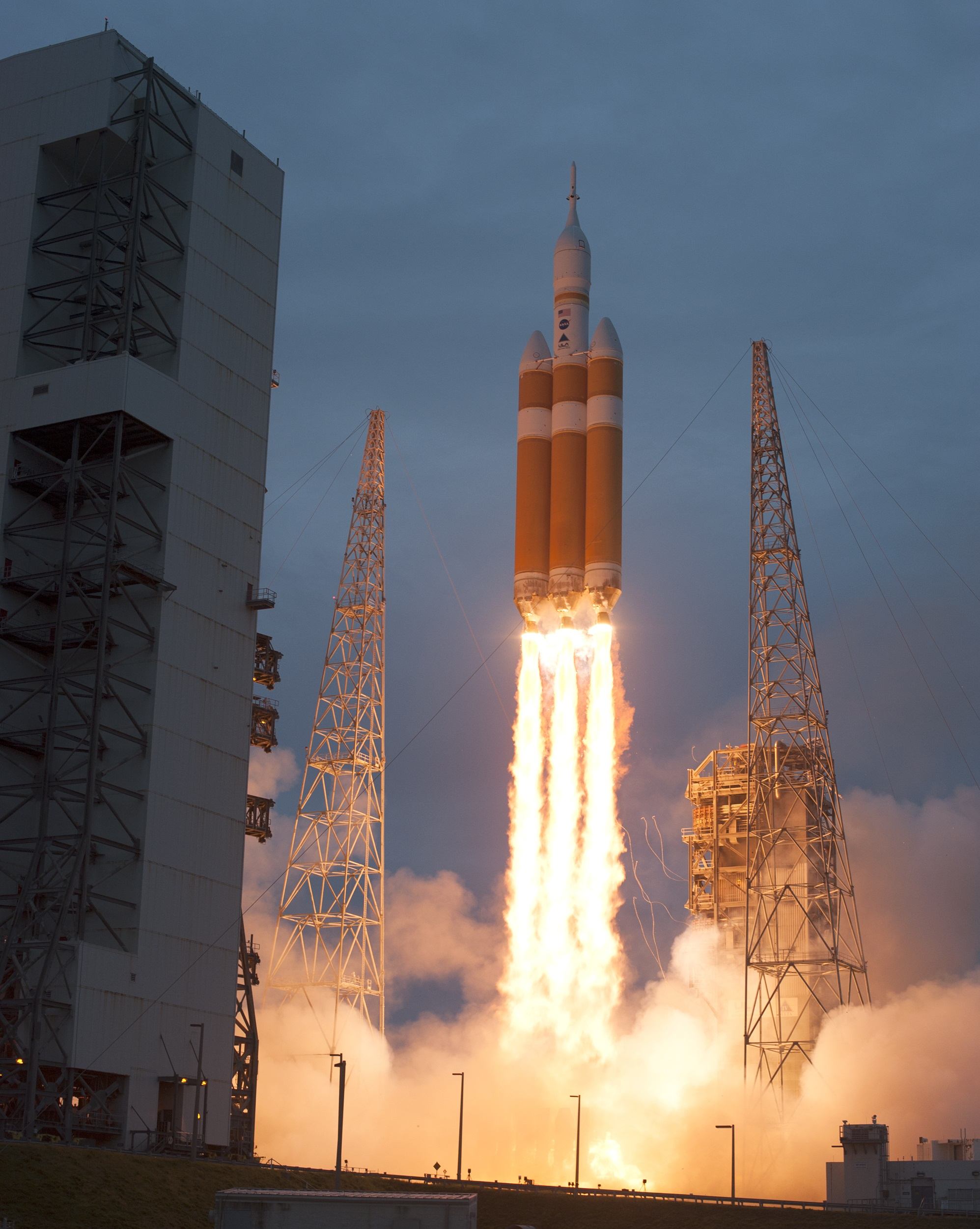
- Launch of EFT-1 on December 5, 2014
- Names: Orion Flight Test-1 (OFT-1)
- Mission type: Technology demonstration
- Operator: NASA
- COSPAR ID: 2014-077A
- SATCAT no.: 40329
- Website: nasa.gov/mission/exploration-flight-test-1
- Mission duration: 4 hours and 24 minutes
- Orbits completed: 2

Spacecraft properties
- Spacecraft: Orion CM-001
- Manufacturer: Lockheed Martin
- Launch mass: 21,000 kg (46,000 lb)

Start of mission
- Launch date: December 5, 2014, 12:05 UTC (7:05 am EST)
- Rocket: Delta IV Heavy No. 369
- Launch site: Cape Canaveral, SLC-37B
- Contractor: United Launch Alliance

End of mission
- Recovered by: USS Anchorage
- Landing date: December 5, 2014, 16:29 UTC (8:29 am PST)
- Landing site: Pacific Ocean, 640 mi (1,030 km) SSE of San Diego (23.61°N 114.46°W)

Orbital parameters
- Reference system: Geocentric orbit
- Regime: Medium Earth orbit
- Perigee altitude: 115 mi (185 km)
- Apogee altitude: 3,610 mi (5,809 km)
- Inclination: 28.8°
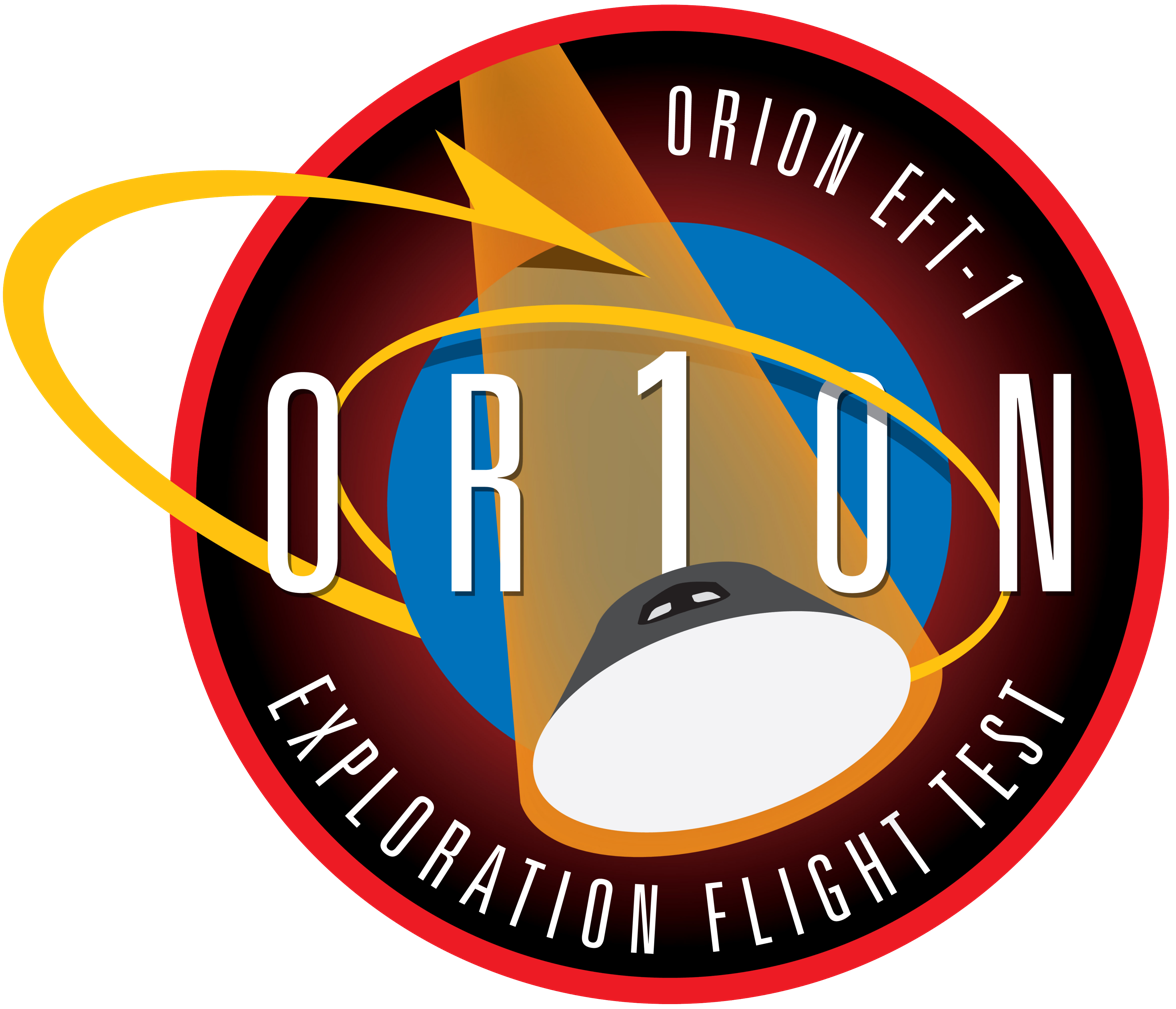
- Mission insignia Orion program

Exploration Flight Test-1 or EFT-1 (previously known as Orion Flight Test 1 or OFT-1) was a technology demonstration mission and the first flight test of the crew module portion of the Orion spacecraft. Without a crew, it was launched on December 5, 2014, at 12:05 UTC (7:05 am EST, local time at the launch site) by a Delta IV Heavy rocket from Space Launch Complex 37B at the Cape Canaveral Air Force Station.

The mission was a four-hour, two-orbit test of the Orion crew module featuring a high apogee on the second orbit and concluding with a high-energy reentry at around 20,000 miles per hour (32,000 km/h). This mission design corresponds to the AS-201 and AS-202 missions of 1966, which validated the flight control system and heat shield of the Apollo command and service module at re-entry conditions planned for the return from lunar missions.

== Objectives ==
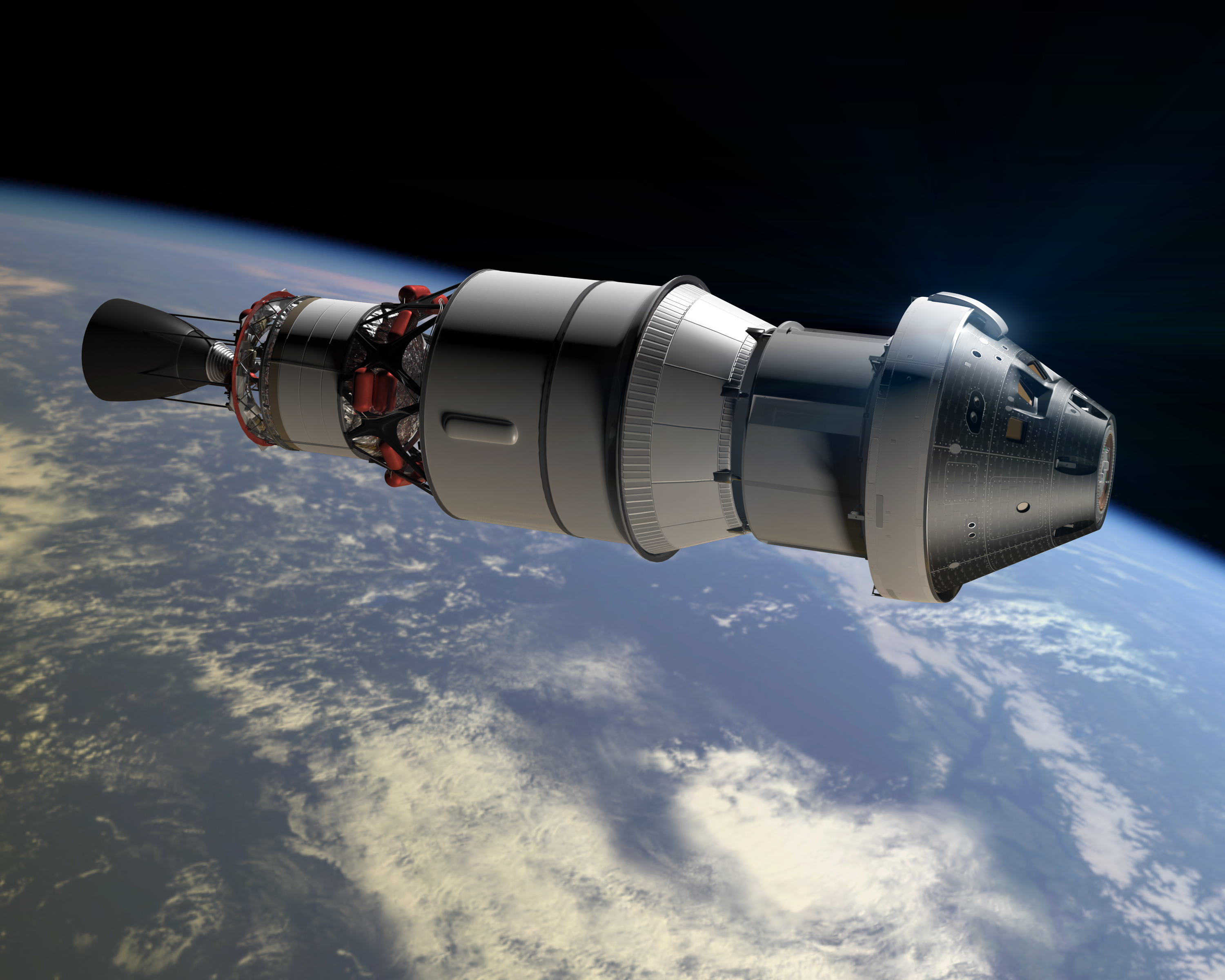
Rendering of Orion capsule and Delta IV upper-stage during EFT-1

EFT-1 tested several systems of the crew module portion of the Orion spacecraft, including separation events, avionics, heat shield performance, parachutes, and recovery operations. The uncrewed test flight served as a precursor to Orion's first mission aboard the Space Launch System (SLS) on Artemis I. Because the European Service Module was not yet available, Orion flew with a structural representation. It also carried only a partial launch abort system, limited to the motor used to jettison the system at the end of launch, along with an Orion-to-stage adapter designed for future use with the SLS.

For the mission, Orion remained attached to the dummy service module, which itself was connected to the Delta IV Heavy's upper stage. This stage was nearly identical to the Interim Cryogenic Upper Stage planned for the Block 1 version of the SLS. Unlike future flights, Orion relied on internal batteries for power rather than photovoltaic arrays.

Data returned from EFT-1 informed Orion's design and were incorporated into its critical design review (CDR) in April 2015. These results helped pave the way for the Artemis I mission, which launched on November 16, 2022, more than seven years after EFT-1.

== Vehicle assembly ==
Orion CM-001 used on the EFT-1 mission was built by Lockheed Martin. On June 22, 2012, the final welds of the EFT-1 Orion were completed at the Michoud Assembly Facility in New Orleans, Louisiana. It was then transported to Kennedy Space Center's Operations and Checkout Building, where the remainder of the spacecraft was completed. The Delta IV rocket was put in a vertical position on October 1, 2014, and Orion was mated with the vehicle on November 11.

== Flight ==
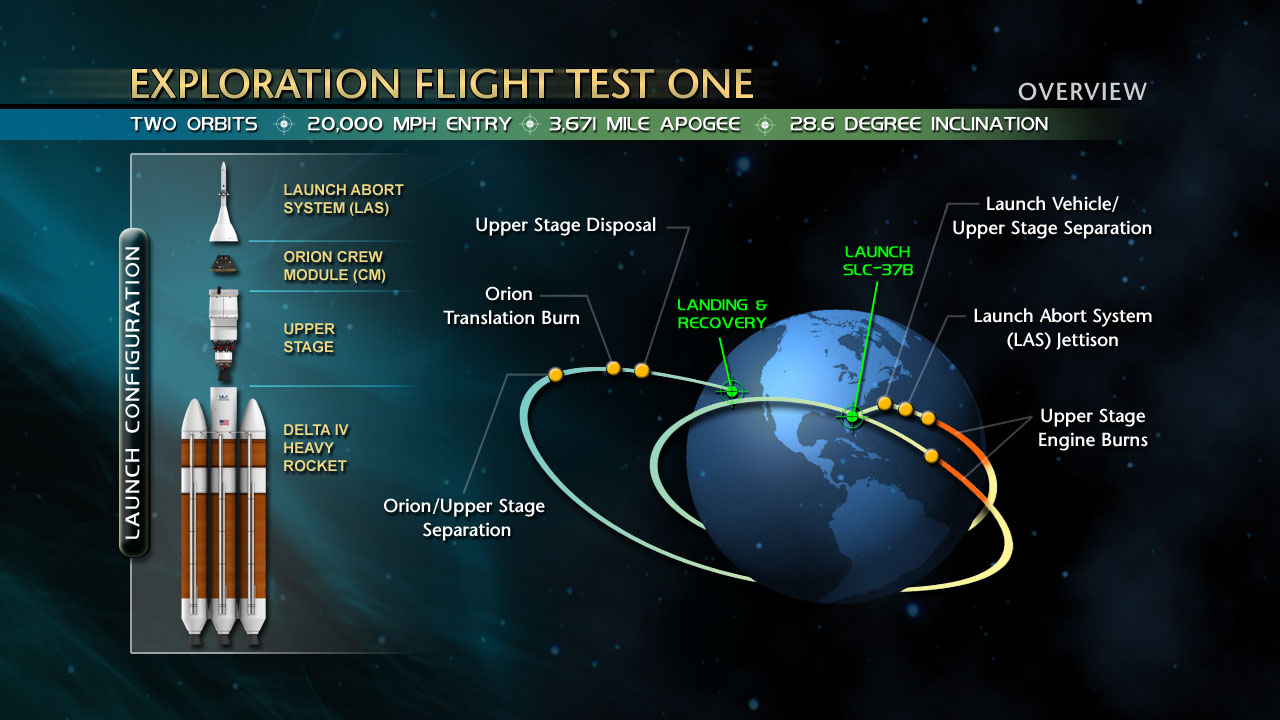
Mission diagram

The four-and-a-half-hour flight took the Orion spacecraft on two orbits of Earth. Peak apogee was approximately 3,610 miles (5,809 km). The distance allowed the spacecraft to reach reentry speeds of up to 20,000 miles per hour (32,000 km/h), which exposed the heat shield to temperatures up to around 4,000 °F (2,200 °C).

Time	Event
L‑6:00:00	Orion powered on, mobile service tower retracts, fueling of Delta IV Heavy begins
L+0:00:00	Launch (12:05 UTC, 7:05 am EST)
0:01:23	Max q
0:01:23	Vehicle is supersonic
0:03:56	Booster separation
0:05:30	First stage MECO (main engine cut-off)
0:05:33	First stage separation
0:05:49	Second stage ignition No. 1
0:06:15	Service module fairing jettison
0:06:20	Launch Abort System jettison
0:17:39	SECO No. 1 (second engine cut-off), Orion begins first orbit
1:55:26	Orion completes first orbit, second stage ignition No. 2
2:00:09	SECO No. 2
2:05:00	Enter first high radiation period
2:20:00	Leave first high radiation period
2:40:00	Reaction control system (RCS) activation
3:05:00	Reach peak apogee: 5,800 km (3,600 mi)
3:23:41	Orion separates from combined service module/second stage, second stage performs disposal burn
3:57:00	Orion positions for reentry
4:13:41	Entry interface
4:20:22	Forward bay cover jettisons, parachute deployment begins (two drogues, three mains)
4:24:46	Splashdown and recovery by the USS Anchorage crew

After splashdown in the Pacific Ocean, crews from the USS Anchorage recovered the EFT-1 Orion crew vehicle. Plans were later made to outfit the capsule for an ascent abort test in 2017.

== Launch attempts ==
Attempt	Planned	Result	Turnaround	Reason	Decision point	Weather go (%)	Notes
1	4 Dec 2014, 7:05:00 am	Scrubbed	—	Weather	4 Dec 2014, 9:44 am (T−00:03:09)		A boat entered the launch range, wind gusts in excess of speed limit (21 kn or 24 mph or 39 km/h), and a fuel fill and drain valve did not close. 24-hour recycle.
2	5 Dec 2014, 7:05:00 am	Success	1 day 0 hours 0 minutes				

== Public outreach ==
NASA heavily promoted the mission, collaborating with Sesame Street and its characters to educate children about the flight test and the Orion spacecraft.

The Orion capsule used for EFT-1 is now on display at the Kennedy Space Center Visitor Complex, in the "NASA Now" exhibit.

== Gallery ==
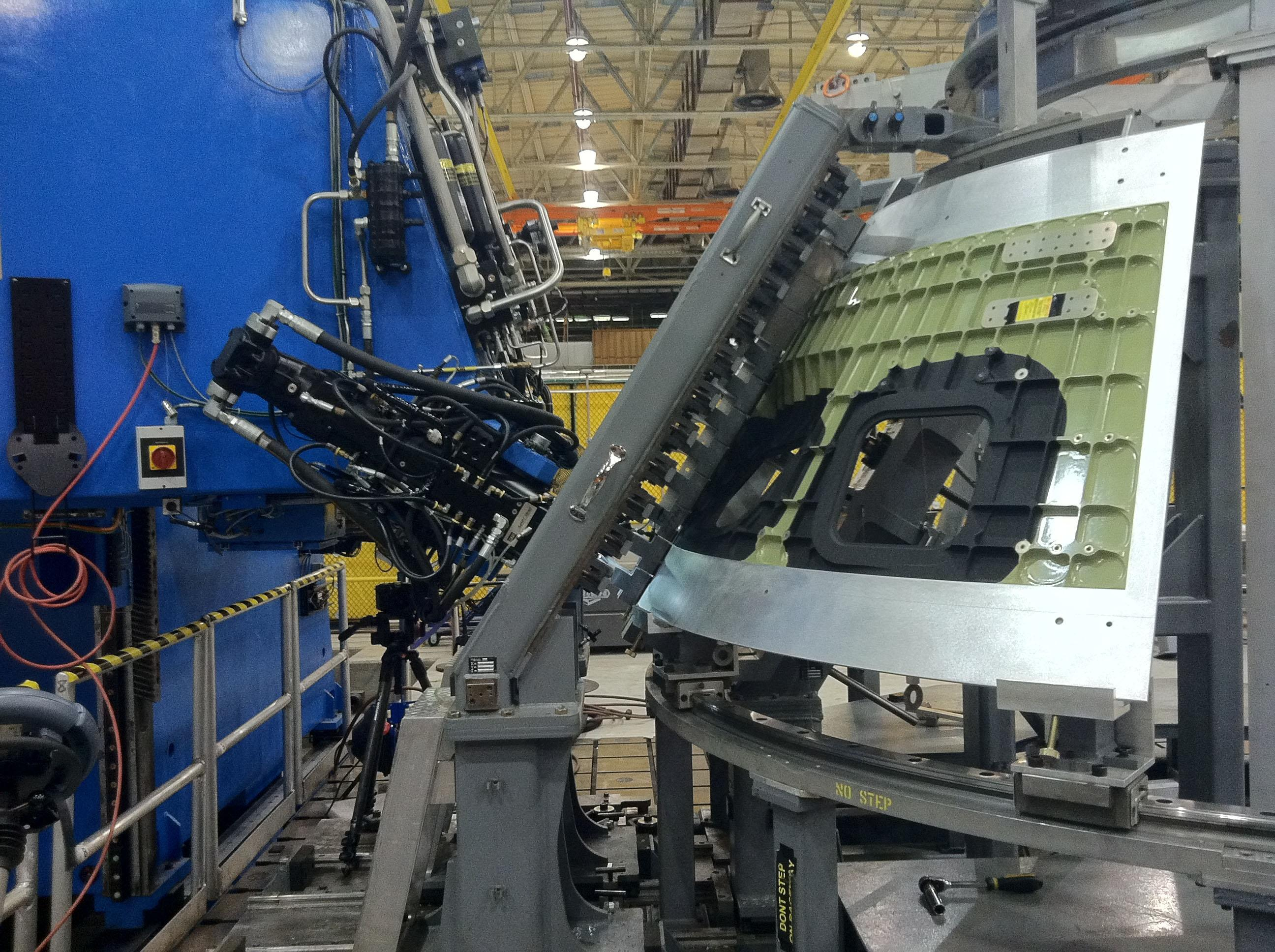
First weld on the EFT-1 Orion structure, September 2011

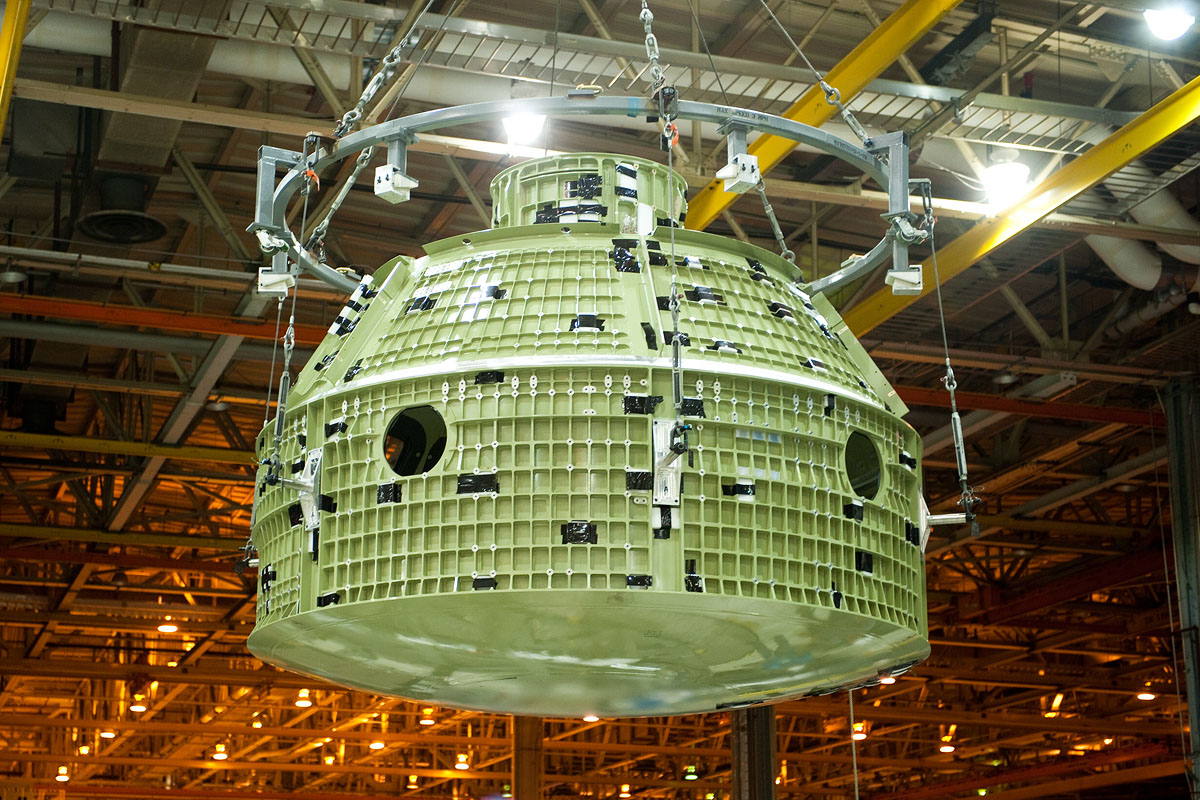
Orion structure after final weld, June 2012, at the Michoud Assembly Facility

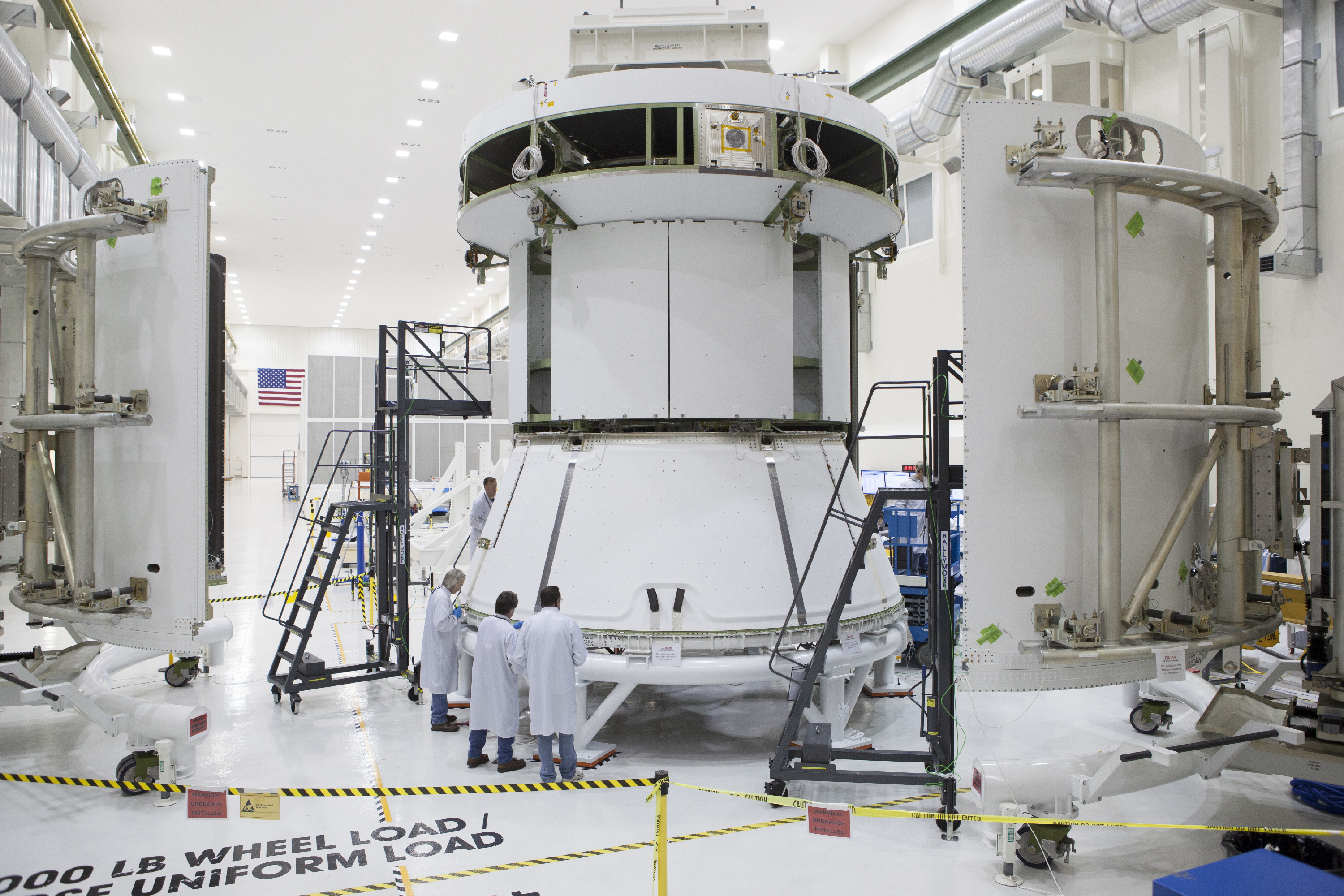
Orion's Service Module prior to encapsulation, December 2013, in the Operations and Checkout Building (O&C)

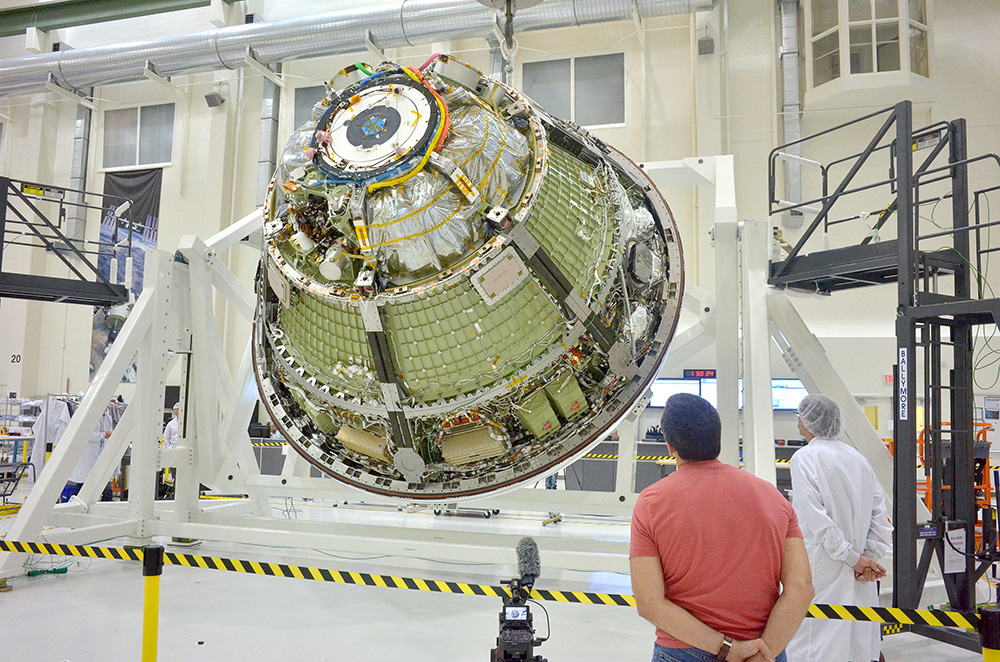
EFT-1 Orion Weight and Center of Gravity Test, June 2014

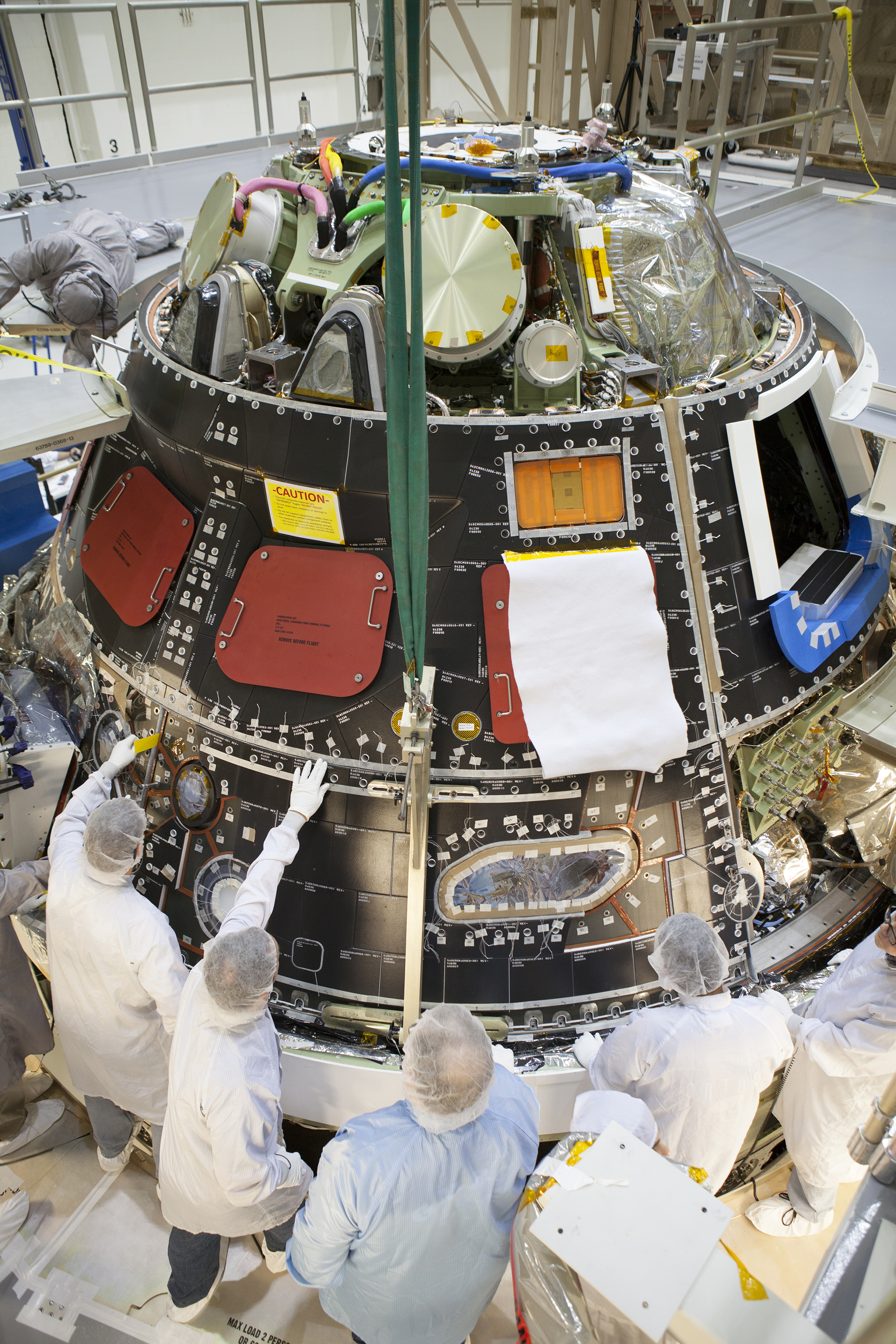
EFT-1 Orion back shell tile installation, September 2014

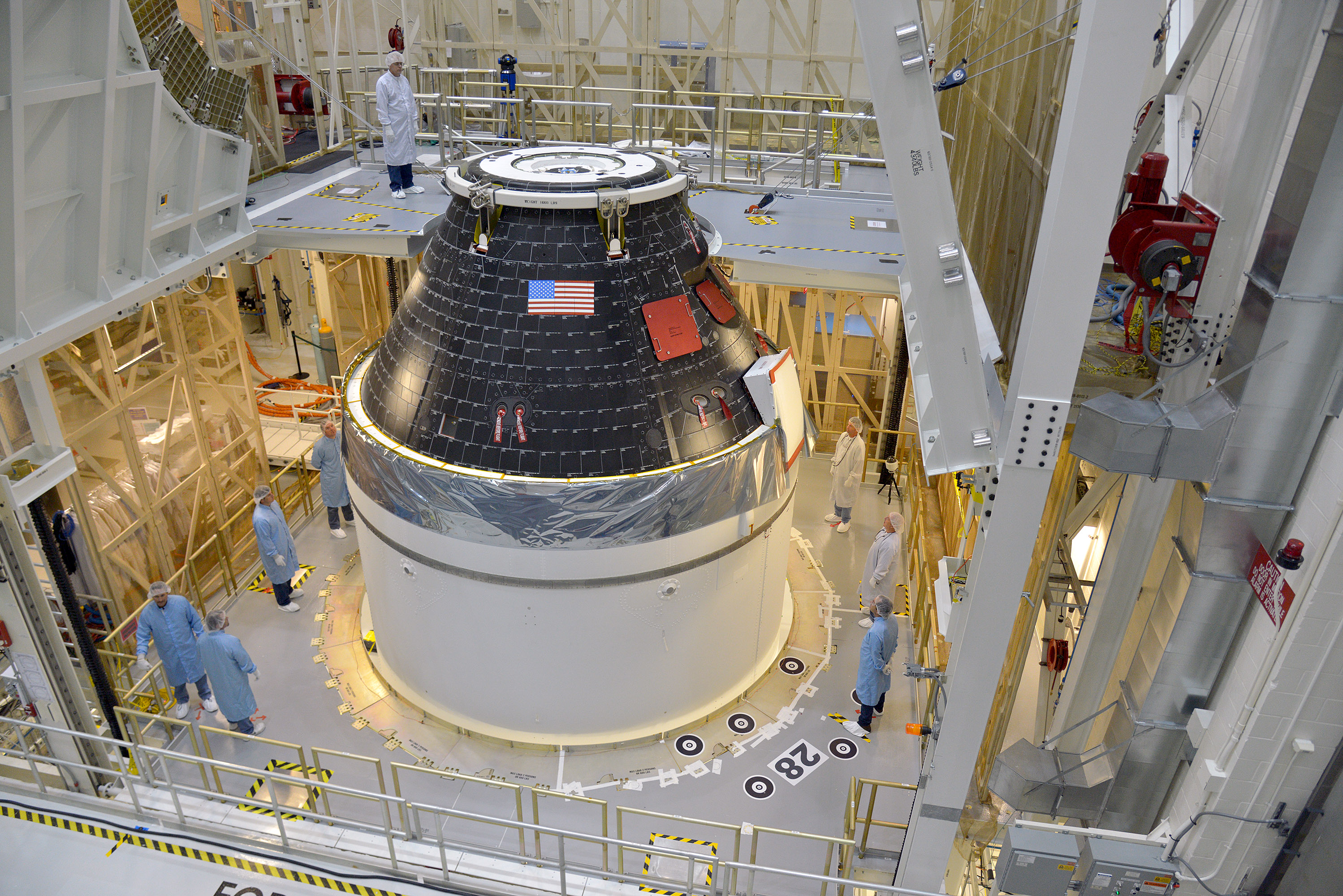
Completed EFT-1 Orion, September 2014

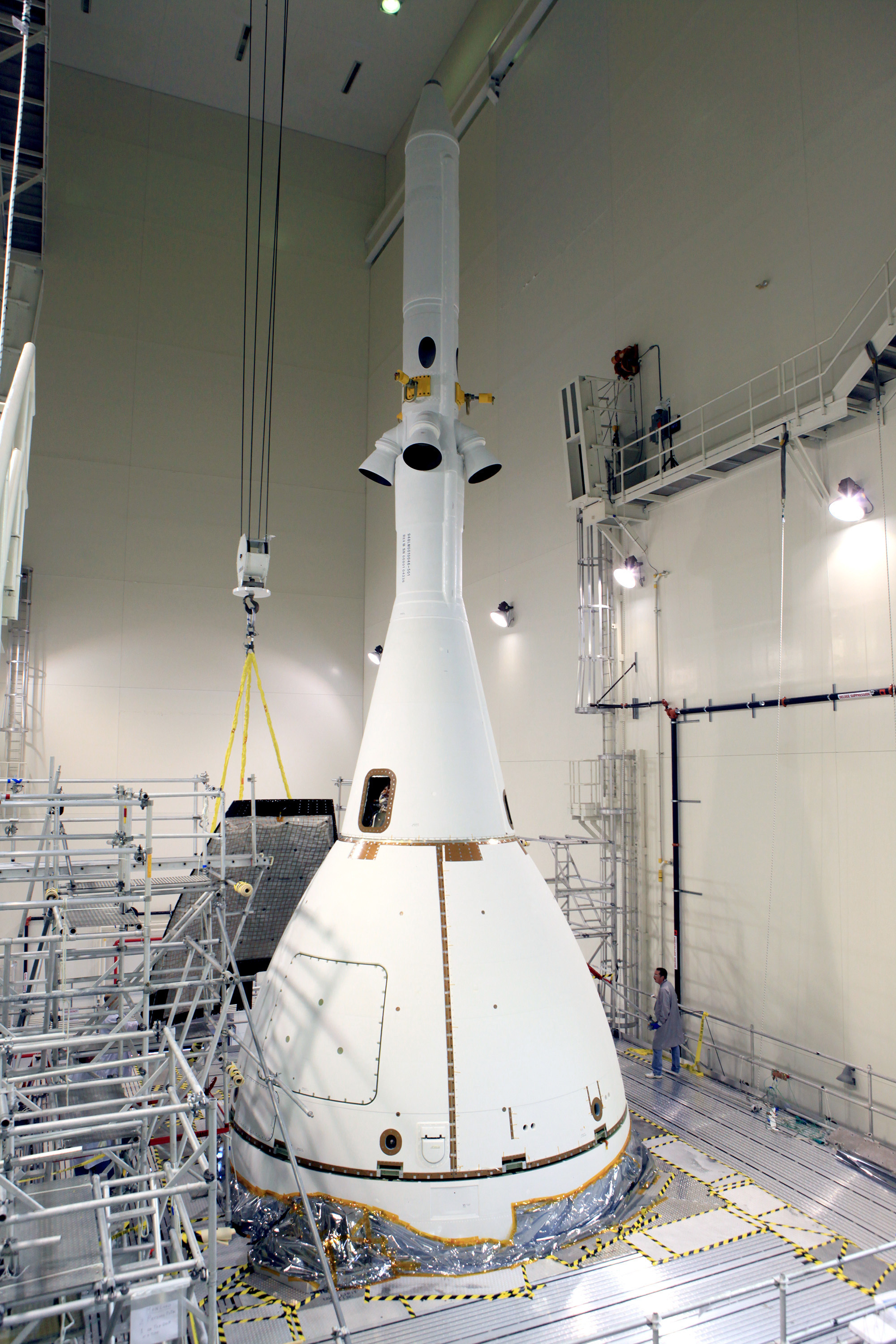
EFT-1 Orion in fairing and with LES, October 2014

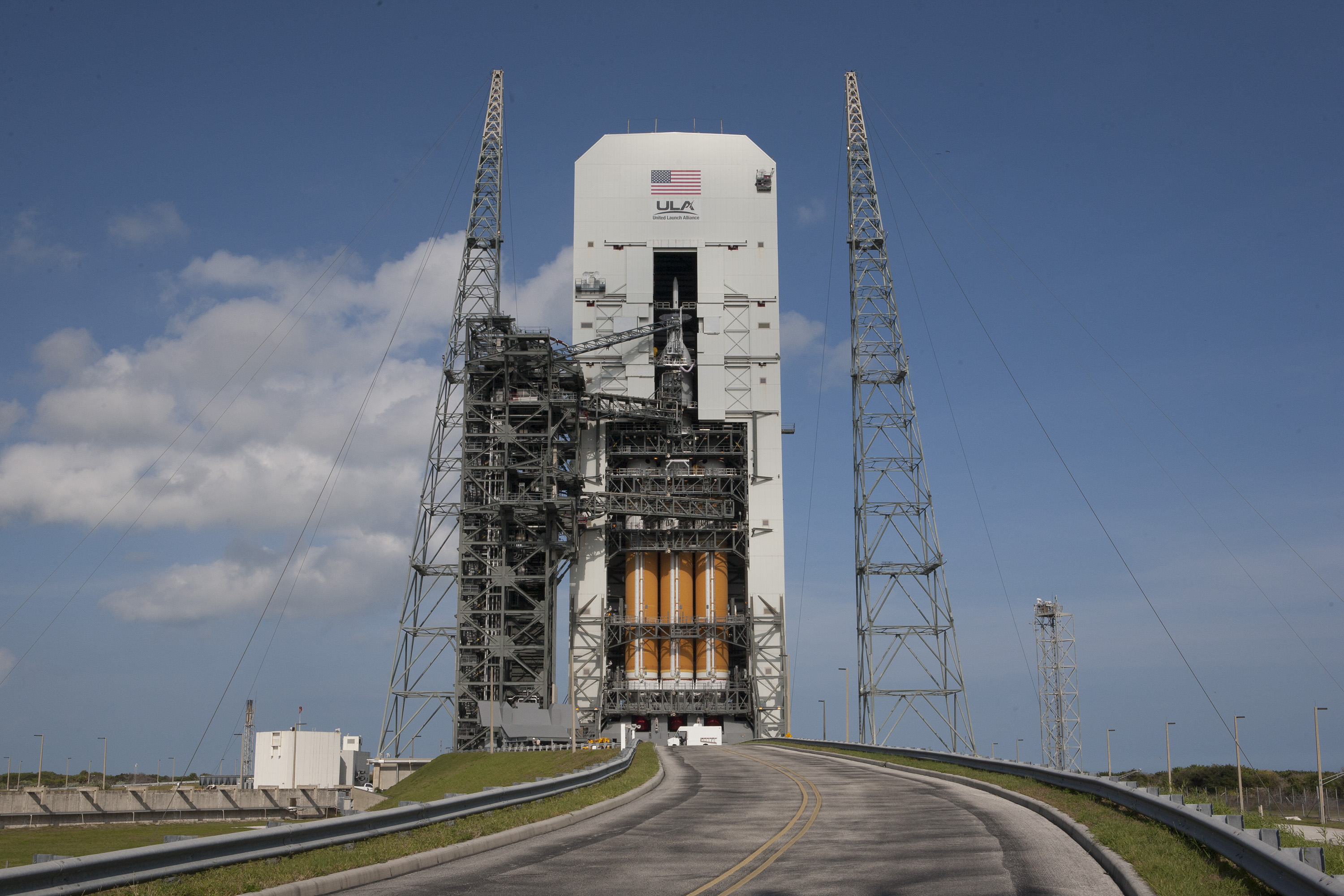
EFT-1 Orion on its Delta IV Heavy

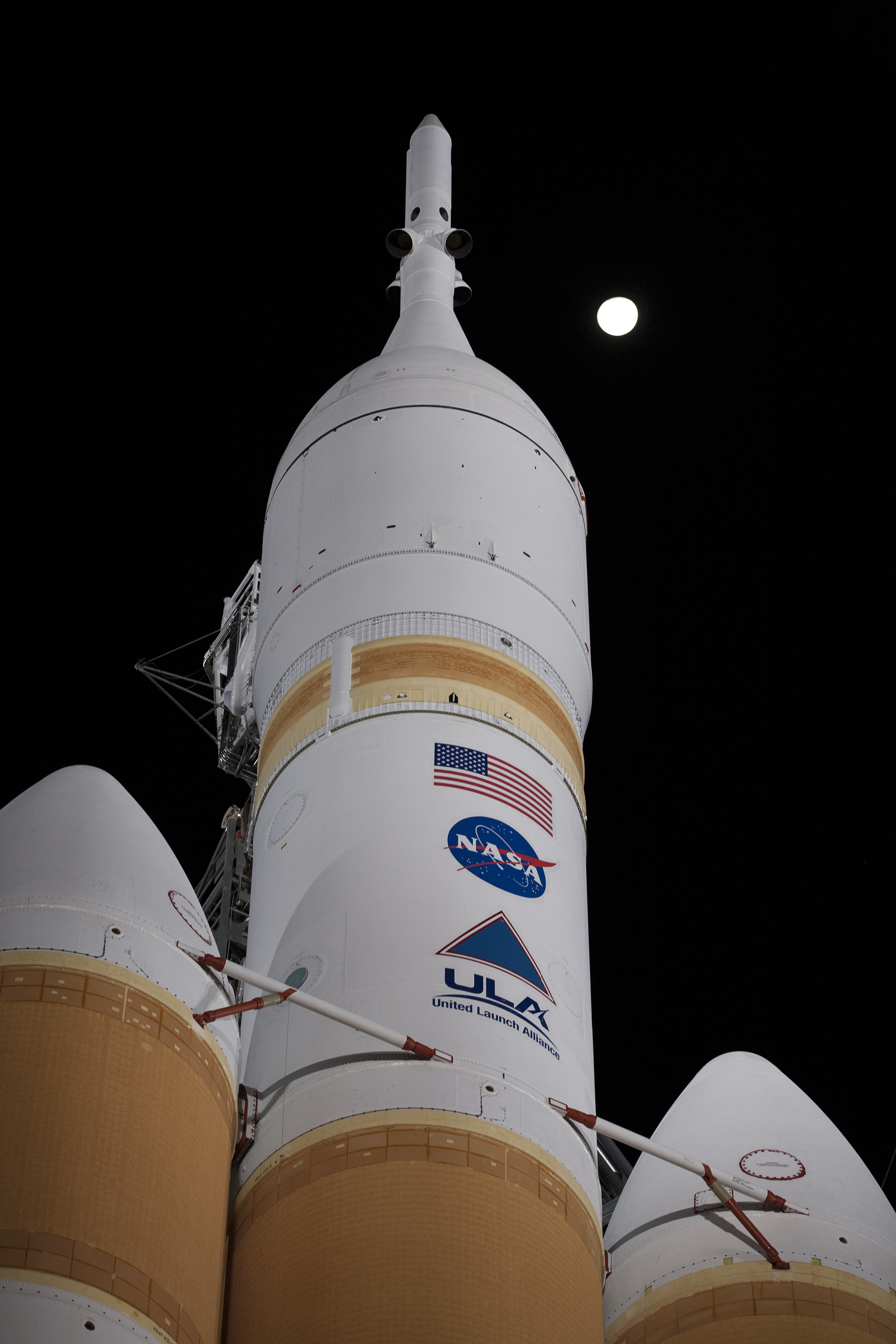
EFT-1 Orion on its Delta IV Heavy

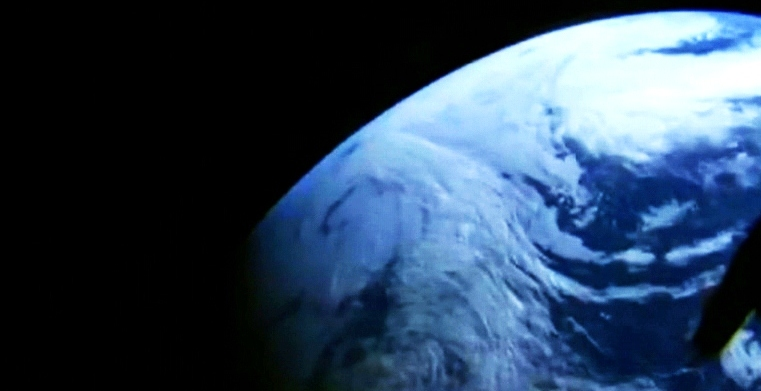
Earth seen from the EFT-1 Orion spacecraft

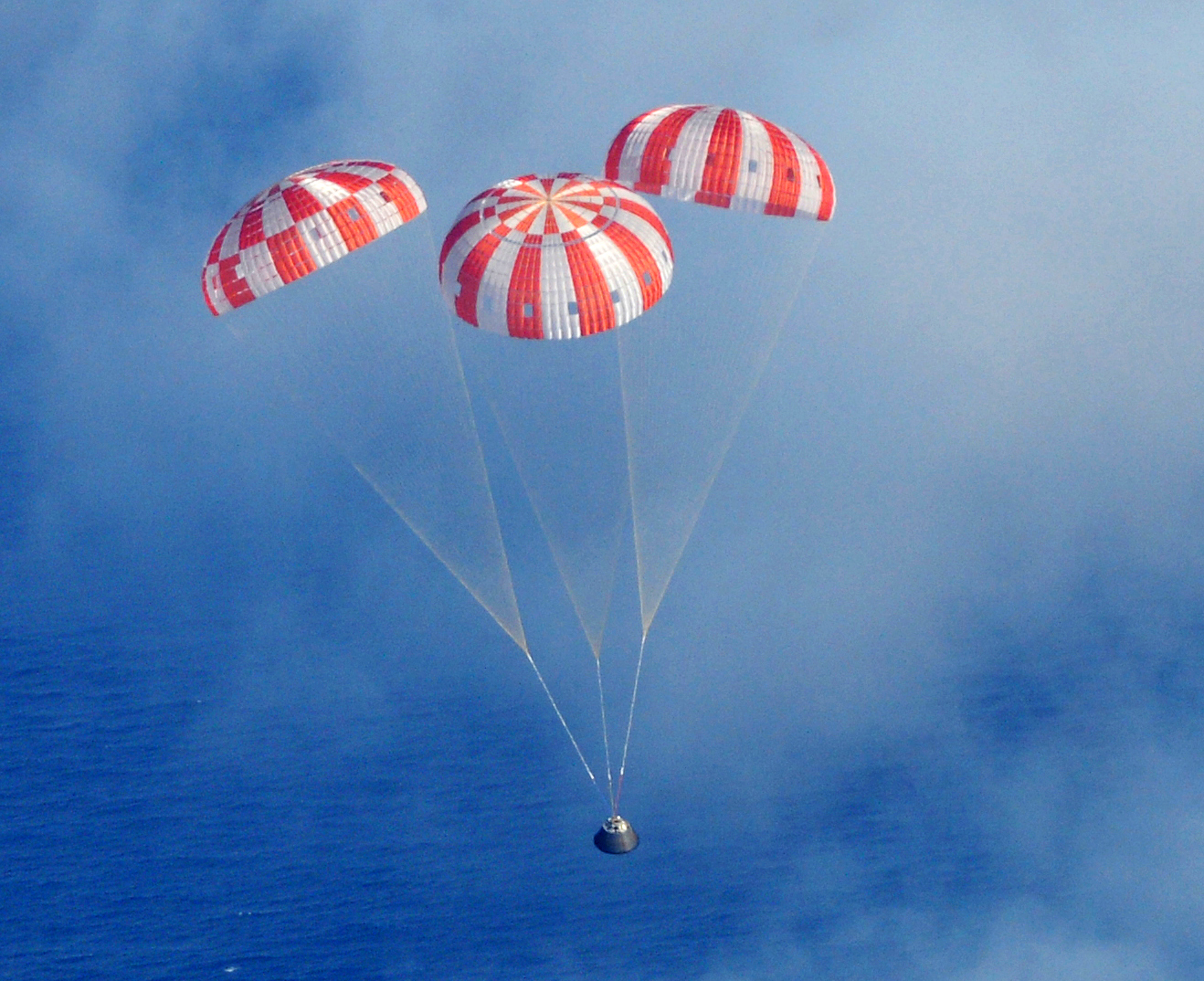
The EFT-1 Orion before splashdown, 5 December 2014

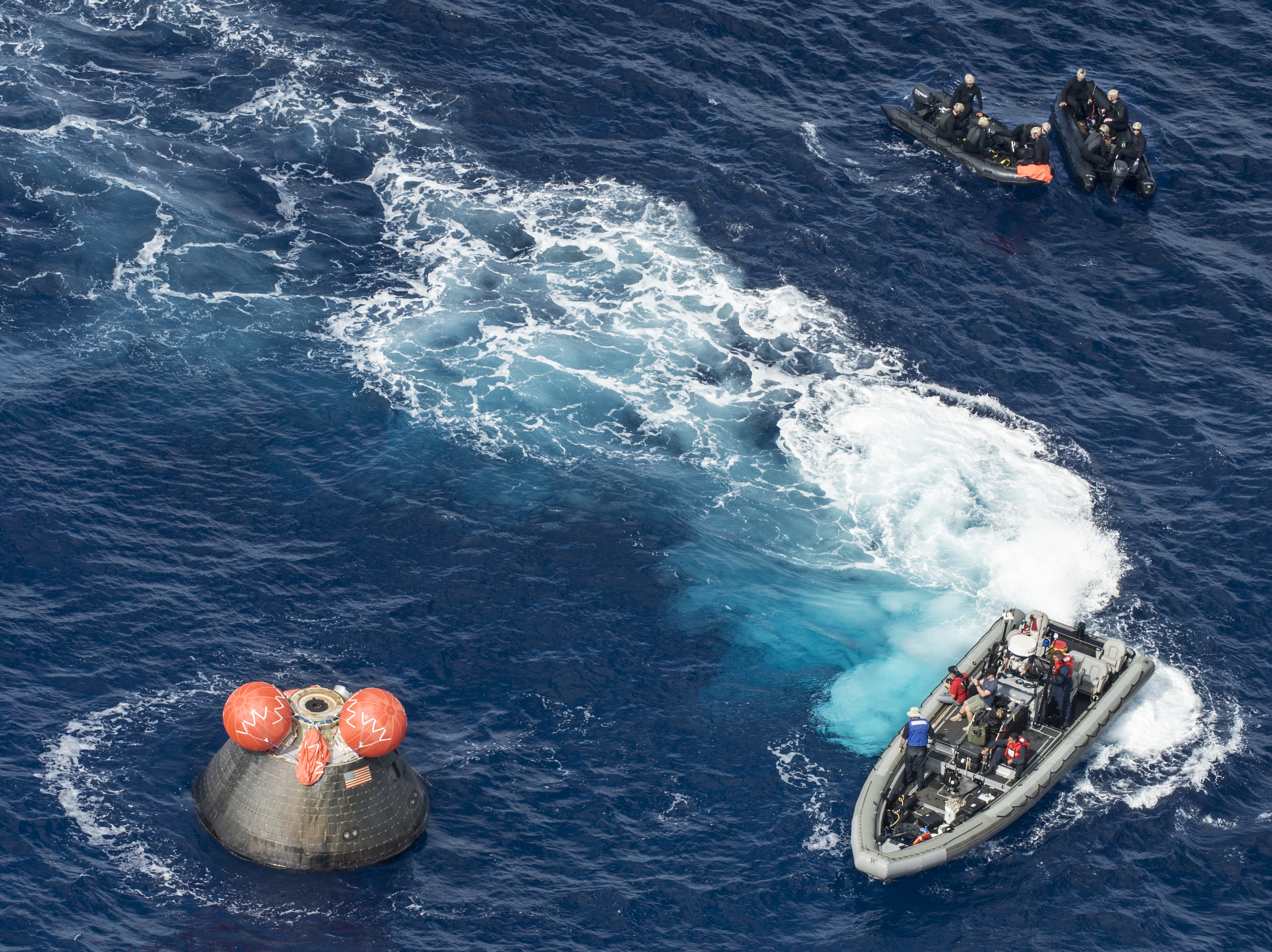
Recovery of the EFT-1 Orion by the USS Anchorage, 5 December 2014

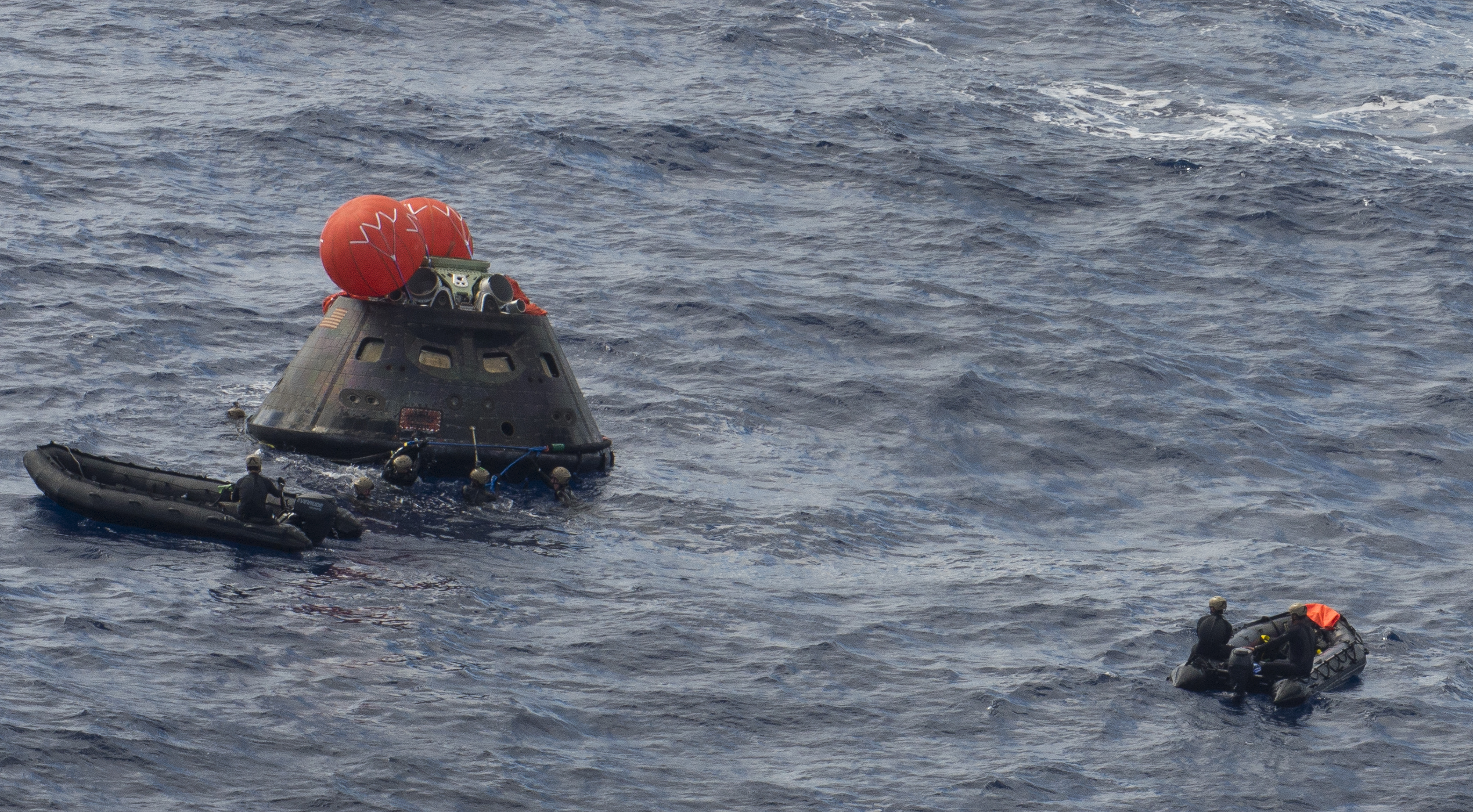
Recovery of Orion capsule

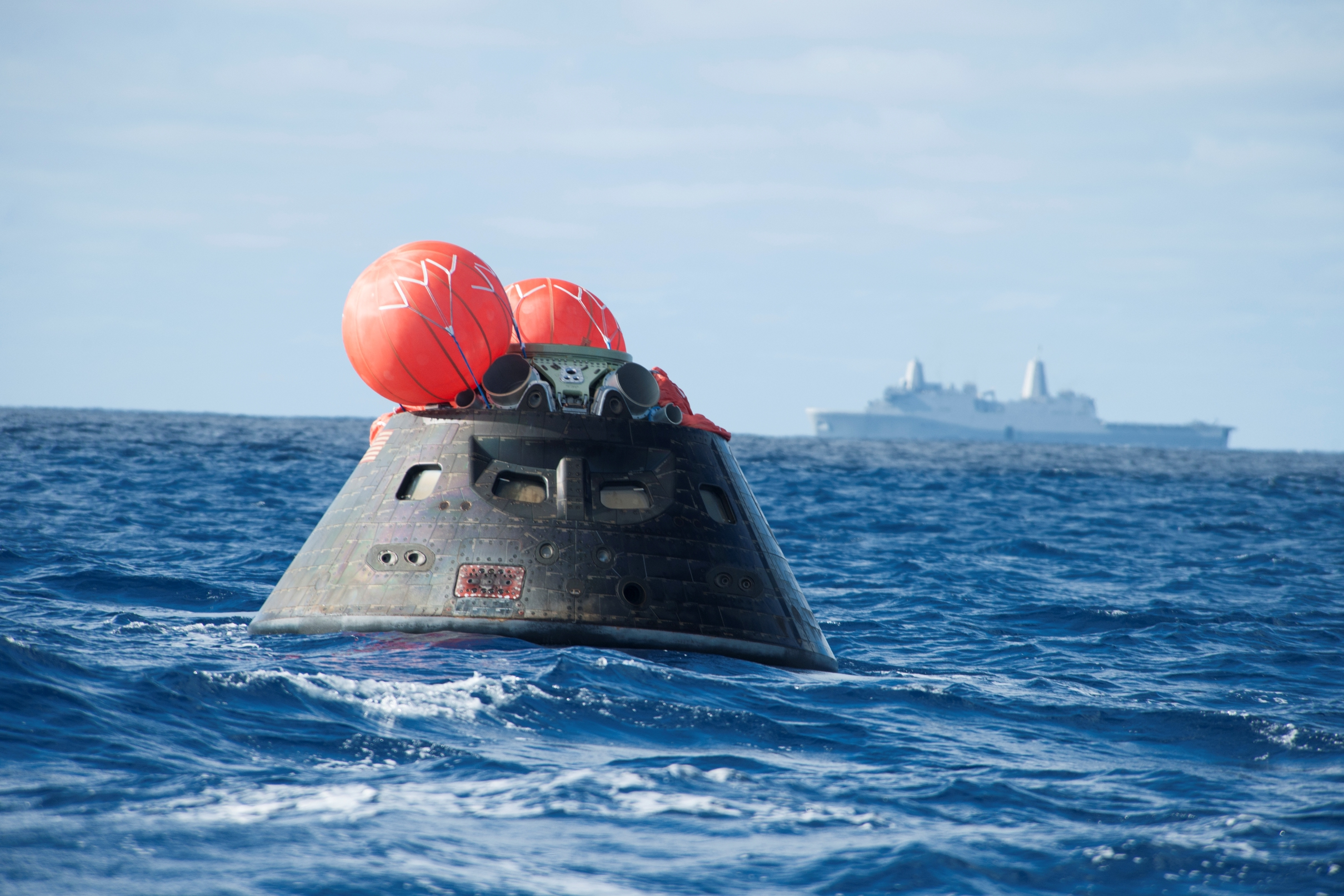
Recovery of Orion capsule
