= Space policy of the George W. Bush administration =

United States space policy from 2001 to 2009

The space policy of the George W. Bush administration is mainly associated with the Vision for Space Exploration, announced in 2004. A formal National Space Policy was released in 2006.

== Vision for space exploration ==
The Space Shuttle Columbia disaster occurred midway through President George W. Bush's first term. The Columbia Accident Investigation Board's report on the incident was released in August 2003. The Vision for Space Exploration, announced on January 14, 2004 by President George W. Bush, was seen as a response to the Columbia disaster, the state of human spaceflight at NASA, and as a way to regain public enthusiasm for space exploration. The Vision for Space Exploration sought to implement a sustained and affordable human and robotic program to explore the Solar System and beyond; extend human presence across the Solar System, starting with a human return to the Moon by the year 2020, in preparation for human exploration of Mars and other destinations; develop the innovative technologies, knowledge, and infrastructures both to explore and to support decisions about the destinations for human exploration; and to promote international and commercial participation in exploration to further U.S. scientific, security, and economic interests

The President's Commission on Implementation of United States Space Exploration Policy was a Presidential Commission formed to this end by President Bush on January 27, 2004. Its final report was submitted on June 4, 2004. This led to the NASA Exploration Systems Architecture Study in mid-2005, which developed plans for carrying out the programs specified in the Vision for Space Exploration. This led to the beginning of the Constellation program and the development of the Orion crew module, the Altair lunar lander, and the Ares I and Ares V rockets. The Ares I-X test vehicle, a prototype for the Ares I rocket, was successfully launched in October 2009.

== 2006 U.S. National Space Policy ==
A new National Space Policy was released on August 31, 2006 that established overarching national policy that governs the conduct of U.S. space activities. This policy superseded the earlier Clinton-era National Space Policy (Presidential Decision Directive/NSC-49/NSTC-8) of September 14, 1996.

The new National Space Policy rejects Arms control agreements that might limit U.S. flexibility in space and asserts a right to deny access to space to anyone "hostile to U.S. interest." The George W. Bush administration had said the policy revisions are not a prelude to introducing weapons systems into Earth orbit, and that the policy is not about developing or deploying weapons in space.

The document, the first full revision of overall space policy in 10 years, emphasized security issues, encouraged private enterprise in space, and characterized the role of U.S. space diplomacy largely in terms of persuading other nations to support U.S. policy. The United States National Security Council stated in written comments that an update was needed to "reflect the fact that space has become an even more important component of U.S. economic security, national security, and homeland security." The military had become increasingly dependent on communications satellites and GPS, as had providers of Mobile phones, personal navigation devices, and automated teller machines (ATMs).

The 2006 National Space Policy was superseded by the Obama administration's newer National Space Policy on June 28, 2010.

=== Background ===
The National Space Policy stated that for five decades, the United States had led the world in space exploration and use and had developed a solid civil, commercial, and national security foundation. Space activities had improved life in the United States and around the world, enhancing security, protecting lives and the environment, speeding information flow, serving as an engine for economic growth, and revolutionized the way people view their place in the world and the cosmos. Space had become a place that was increasingly used by a host of nations, consortia, businesses, and entrepreneurs.

The policy stated that in this century, those who effectively utilize space would enjoy added prosperity and security and will hold a substantial advantage over those who do not. Freedom of action in space is as important to the United States as air power and sea power. In order to increase knowledge, discovery, economic prosperity and to enhance national security, the United States must have robust, effective and efficient space capabilities.

Bush's top goals were to 'strengthen the nation's space leadership and ensure that space capabilities are available in time to further U.S. national security, homeland security, and foreign policy objectives" and to "enable unhindered U.S. operations in and through space to defend our interest there." The Bush policy called on the Secretary of Defense to provide "space capabilities" to support missile-warning systems as well as "multi-layered and integrated defense. Sections of the 1996 Clinton policy and the Bush revision have similarities, and the general principles of U.S. space policy have changed very little since they first appeared in the Carter Administration's PD/NSC-37 of 1978. The NSC and the Department of Defense emphasized that continuity with previous policies. But some see a significant divergence apparent in the first two goals of each document.

The Carter Policy had simply stated, without much specification in the unclassified version, that "The United States will pursue Activities in space in support of its right of self-defense." Reagan's space policies made similarly general statements. Clinton's top goals were to "enhance knowledge of the Earth, the solar system and the universe through human and robotic exploration" and to "strengthen and maintain the national security of the United States." The Clinton space policy, like the space policies of Carter and Reagan, also stated that "The United States will conduct those space activities necessary for national security." These activities included "providing support for the United States' inherent right of self-defense and our defense commitments to allies and friends; deterring, warning, and if necessary, defending against enemy attack; assuring that hostile forces cannot prevent our own use of space; and countering, if necessary, space systems and services used for hostile purposes."

The Clinton 1996 policy also said the United States would develop and operate "space control capabilities to ensure freedom of action in space" only when such steps would be "consistent with treaty obligations." The Bush policy accepts current international agreements by states: "The United States will oppose the development of new legal regimes or other restrictions that seek to prohibit or limit U.S. access to or use of space."

=== Principles of the U.S. national space policy ===
1. The United States is committed to the exploration and use of outer space by all nations for peaceful purposes" allow U.S. defense and intelligence-related activities in pursuit of national interest;
2. The United States rejects any claims to sovereignty by any nation over outer space or celestial bodies, or any portion thereof, and rejects any limitations on the fundamental right of the United States to operate in and acquire data from space;
3. The United States will seek to cooperate with other nations in the peaceful use of outer space to extend the benefits of space, enhance space exploration, and to protect and promote freedom around the world;
4. The United States considers space systems to have the rights of passage through and operations in space without interference. Consistent with this principle, the United States will view purposeful interference with its space systems as an infringement on its rights;
5. The United States considers space capabilities—including the ground and space segments and supporting links—vital to its national interest. Consistent with this policy, the United States will; preserve its rights, capabilities, and freedom of action in space, dissuade or deter others from either impeding those rights or developing capabilities intended to do so; take those actions necessary to protect its space capabilities; respond to interference; and deny, if necessary, adversaries the use of space capabilities hostile to U.S. national interests;
6. The United States will oppose the development of new legal regimes or other restrictions that seek to prohibit or limit U.S. access to or use of space. Proposed arms control agreements or restrictions must not impair the rights of the United States to conduct research, development, testing, and operations or other activities in space for U.S. national interest; and
7. The United States is committed to encouraging and facilitating a growing and entrepreneurial U.S. commercial space sector. Toward that end, the United States Government will use U.S. commercial space capabilities to the maximum practical extent, consistent with national security.

=== Goals of the U.S. space policy ===
1. Strengthen the nations' space leadership and ensure that space capabilities are available in time to further U.S. national security, homeland security, and foreign policy objectives;
2. Enable unhindered U.S. operations in and through space to defend our interest there;
3. Implement and sustain an innovative human and robotic exploration program with the objective of extending human presence across the solar system;
4. Increase the benefits of civil exploration, scientific discovery, and environmental activities;
5. Enable a dynamic, globally competitive domestic commercial space sector in order to promote innovation, strengthen U.S. leadership, and protect national, homeland, and economic security;
6. Enable a robust science and technology base supporting national security, homeland security, and civil space activities; and
7. Encourage international cooperation with foreign nations and/or consortia on space activities that are of mutual benefit and that further the peaceful exploration and use of space, as well as to advance national security, homeland security, and foreign policy objectives.

=== Controversies ===
The Henry Stimson Center, a nonpartisan think tank that follows the space-weaponry issue, said the policy changes will reinforce international suspicions that the United States may seek to develop, test and deploy space weapons. The concerns are amplified, he said, by the administration's refusal to enter negotiations or even less formal discussions on the subject. Additionally, Joan Johnson-Freese of the Naval War College has argued recently in 2007 that while vague in many aspects, the new Bush Space Policy in 2006 read in the past historical context of the last few years can be seen to promote more of a militarization of space. Johnson-Freese, as recently as January 2008 in a workshop sponsored by the Space Studies Board of the National Research Council, has promoted a global leadership role for NASA because of its vast resources and has indicated that the free passing of spacecraft under the Bush policy should fall under a legal realm rather than leave it to U.S to enforce what it believes is a violation of its use of space.

A number of nations have pushed for talks to ban space weapons; the United States has long been one of a handful of nations opposed to the idea. Although it has abstained from past proposals to ban space weapons, when the issue came up in the United Nations in October 2005, the United States voted for the first time against a call for negotiations—the only "no" against 160 "yes" votes.

Some believe that the U.S. Space Policy violated the Outer Space Treaty, which bans the use of weapons of mass destruction (WMD) in space. The debate over a space weapons ban was complicated, however, by the 2007 unannounced test by China of an anti-satellite weapon against a weather satellite. China had previously supported a ban, and prior to the unannounced test, had routinely stated that it had no anti-satellite weapons programs and that its intentions in space were entirely peaceful.

== See also ==
- Space policy
- Space policy of the United States
- Commission on the Future of the United States Aerospace Industry

Preceded by Space policy of the Bill Clinton administration	Space policy of the United States; 2001–2008	Succeeded by Space policy of the Barack Obama administration
