= Lacefield =

Lacefield is a surname. Notable people with the surname include:

- Cleon Lacefield, American businessman
- Reggie Lacefield (1945–2023), American basketball player
