= Crew Exploration Vehicle =

NASA spacecraft design

CEV initial concept in Lockheed Martin design, showing delta-wing crew module (at right), with a mission module and propulsion stage (with rocket engines) for interplanetary flight.

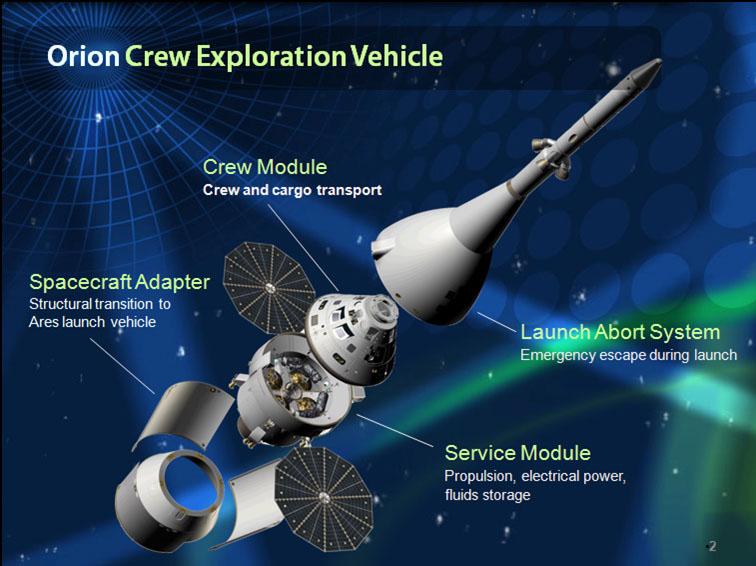
Orion, as a later design, after the initial plans for the Crew Exploration Vehicle led to development of the Orion.

The Crew Exploration Vehicle (CEV) was a component of the U.S. NASA Vision for Space Exploration plan. A competition was held to design a spacecraft that could carry humans to the destinations envisioned by the plan. The winning design was the Orion spacecraft.

Although it was originally conceived during the Space Exploration Initiative during the 90s, official planning for the vehicle began in 2004, with the final request for proposal issued on March 1, 2005, to begin a design competition for the vehicle. For the later design and construction phases, see Orion (spacecraft). The Orion CEV became part of NASA's Constellation program to send human explorers back to the Moon, and then onward to Mars and other destinations in the Solar System. After Constellation was cancelled, it was envisioned for emergency evacuation of the International Space Station, then retained for revived Solar System exploration plans.

== Competition ==
The concept for the vehicle was officially announced in a speech given by George W. Bush at NASA Headquarters on 14 January 2004. The Draft Statement of Work for the CEV was issued by NASA on December 9, 2004, and slightly more than one month later, on January 21, 2005, NASA issued a Draft Request For Proposal (RFP). The Final RFP was issued on March 1, 2005, with the potential bidders being asked to answer by May 2, 2005.

NASA had planned to have a suborbital or an Earth orbit fly-off called Flight Application of Spacecraft Technologies (FAST) between two teams' CEV designs before September 1, 2008. However, in order to permit an earlier date for the start of CEV operations, Administrator Michael D. Griffin had indicated that NASA would select one contractor for the CEV in 2006. From his perspective, this would both help eliminate the currently planned four-year gap between the retirement of the Shuttle in 2010 and the first crewed flight of the CEV in 2014 (by allowing the CEV to fly earlier), and save over $1 billion for use in CEV development.

On June 13, 2005, NASA announced the selection of two consortia, Lockheed Martin Corp. and the team of Northrop Grumman Corp. and The Boeing Co. for further CEV development work. Each team had received a US$28 million contract to come up with a complete design for the CEV and its launch vehicle until August 2006, when NASA would award one of them the task of building the CEV. The teams would also have to develop a plan for their CEV to take part in the assembly of a lunar expedition, either with an Earth orbit rendezvous, a lunar orbit rendezvous, or with a direct ascent. The two teams were composed of:

- Northrop Grumman associated with Boeing as subcontractor for the Spiral One, Alenia Spazio, ARES Corporation, Draper Laboratory and United Space Alliance
- Lockheed Martin associated with EADS SPACE Transportation, United Space Alliance, Aerojet, Honeywell, Orbital Sciences, Hamilton Sundstrand, and Wyle Laboratories (awarded the contract August 31, 2006).

Each contractor-led team included subcontractors that provided the lunar-expedition astronauts with equipment, life-support systems, rocket engines, and onboard navigation systems. The planned orbital or suborbital fly-offs under FAST would have seen the competition of a CEV built by each team, or of a technology demonstrator incorporating CEV technologies. Under FAST, NASA would have chosen the winner to build the final CEV after actual demonstration of this hardware. Fly-offs are often used by the U.S. Air Force to select military aircraft; NASA has never used this approach in awarding contracts. However, as Administrator Griffin had indicated he would abandon the FAST approach, NASA pursued the more traditional approach of selecting a vehicle based on the contractors' proposals.

On August 31, 2006, NASA announced that the contract to design and develop the Orion was awarded to Lockheed Martin Corp. According to Bloomberg News, five analysts it surveyed prior to the award announcement tipped the Northrop team to win. Marco Caceres, a space industry analyst with Teal Group, had projected that Lockheed would lose, partly because of Lockheed Martin's earlier failure on the $912 million X-33 shuttle replacement program; after the contract award, he suggested that Lockheed Martin's work on the X-33 gave it more recent research and development experience in propulsion and materials, which may have helped it win the contract. According to an Aerospace Daily & Defense Report summary of a NASA document explaining the rationale for the contract award, the Lockheed Martin proposal won on the basis of a superior technical approach, lower and more realistic cost estimates, and exceptional performance on Phase I of the CEV program.

Lockheed Martin planned to manufacture the crewed spacecraft at facilities in Texas, Louisiana, and Florida.

== Proposals ==
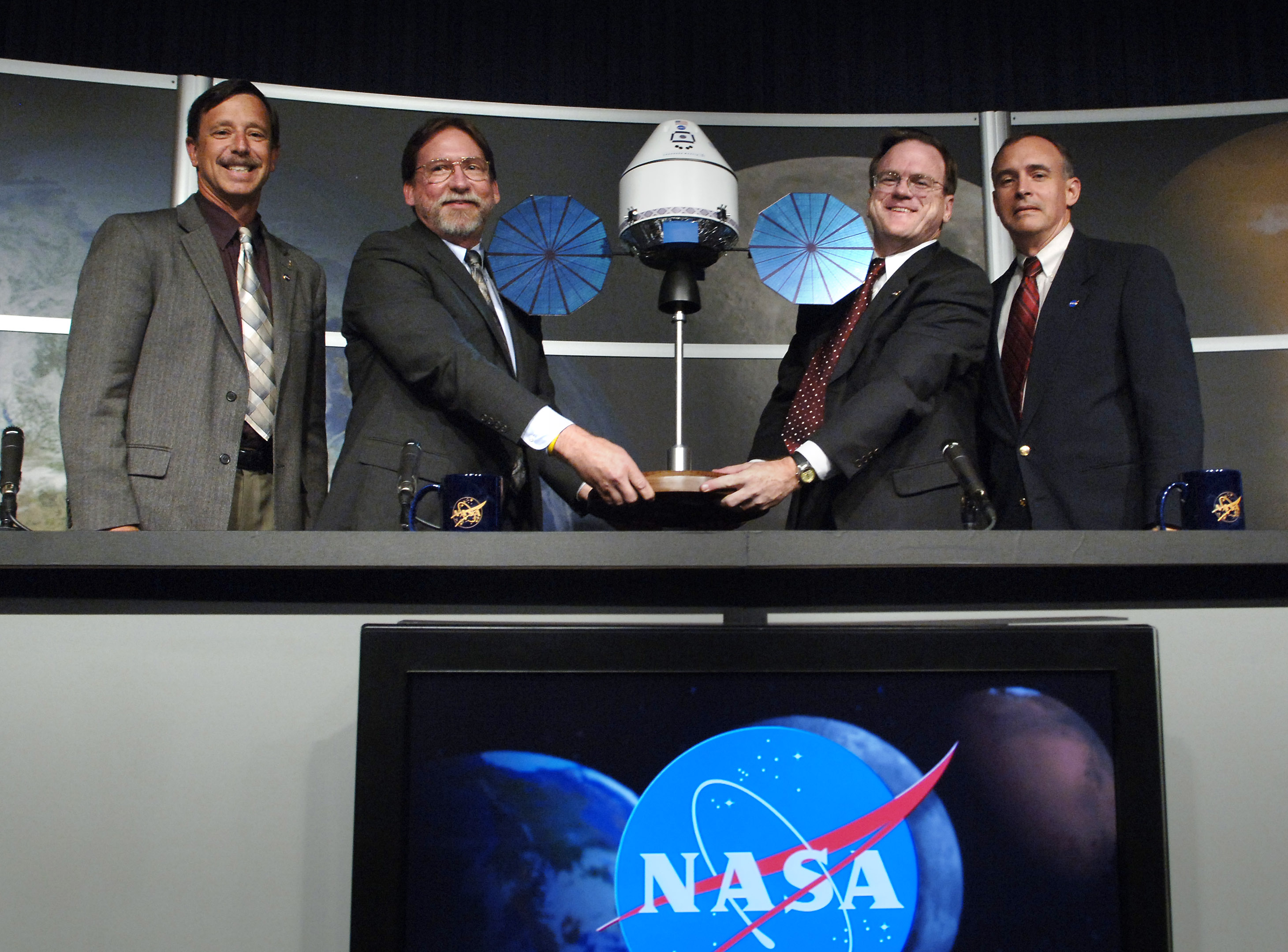
NASA Constellation officials announcing the selected Orion contractor Aug. 31, 2006, at NASA Headquarters

=== Original designs ===
Lockheed's proposed craft was a small space shuttle-shaped lifting body design big enough for six astronauts and their equipment. Its airplane-shaped design made it easier to navigate during high-speed returns to Earth than the capsule-shaped vehicles of the past, according to Lockheed Martin. According to the French daily Le Figaro and the publication Aviation Week and Space Technology, EADS SPACE Transportation would be in charge of the design and construction of the associated Mission Module (MM). The head of the Lockheed team was Cleon Lacefield.

The Lockheed Martin CEV design included several modules in the LEO (low Earth orbit) and crewed lunar versions of the spacecraft, as well as an abort system. The abort system was an escape tower like that used in the Mercury, Apollo, Soyuz, and Shenzhou craft (Gemini, along with the Space Shuttles Enterprise and Columbia [until STS-4] used ejection seats). It would be capable of an abort during any part of the ascent phase of the mission. The crew would sit in the Rescue Module (RM) during launch. According to the publication Aviation Week and Space Technology, the RM would have an outer heat shield of reinforced carbon-carbon and a redundant layer of felt reusable surface insulation underneath in case of RCC failure. The RM comprised the top half of the Crew Module (CM), which comprised the RM and the rest of the lifting-body structure. The CM included living space for four crew members. In an emergency the RM separates from the rest of the CM. The RM would seat up to six crew members, with two to a row, and the CM has living space and provisions for four astronauts for 5–7 days. Extra-Vehicular Activities (EVAs) could be conducted from the CM, which could land on land or water and could be reused 5–10 times.

The mission module would be added to the bottom of the CEV for a lunar mission, and would be able to hold extra consumables and provide extra space for a mission of lunar duration. It would also provide extra power and communications capabilities, and include a docking port for the Lunar Surface Access Module (LSAM). On the bottom of the lunar CEV stack would be the Propulsion or Trans-Earth Injection Module (TEIM) which would provide for return to the Earth from the Moon. It would probably incorporate (according to Aviation Week) 2 Pratt & Whitney RL-10 engines. Together, the RM/CM, MM, and TEIM made up the Lockheed Martin lunar stack. The original idea was to launch the CM, MM, and TEIM on three separate Evolved Expendable Launch Vehicles (EELVs), with one component in each launch. This vehicle would need additional modules to reach lunar orbit and to land on the Moon. However, this plan was to be altered according to the CFI (Call for Improvements), described below.

Unlike the well-publicized Lockheed Martin CEV design, virtually no information was publicly available on the Boeing/Northrop Grumman CEV design. However, it is instructive to note that most publicly released Boeing designs for the canceled Orbital Space Plane (OSP) resembled the Apollo capsule. It was possible that the Boeing CEV is a capsule rather than a lifting body or plane design.

=== Changes to original bids ===
Sean O'Keefe's strategy would have seen the CEV development in two distinct phases. Phase I would have involved the design of the CEV and a demonstration by the potential contractors that they could safely and affordably develop the vehicle. Phase I would have run from bid submissions in 2005 to FAST (by Sept 2008) and down-select to one contractor. Phase II would have begun after FAST and would have involved the final design and construction of the CEV. However, this schedule was unacceptably slow to Mike Griffin, and the plan was changed such that NASA will issue a "Call for Improvements" (CFI) after the release of the ESAS for Lockheed Martin and Boeing to submit Phase II proposals. NASA chose Lockheed Martin's consortium as the winning consortium on 31 August 2006.

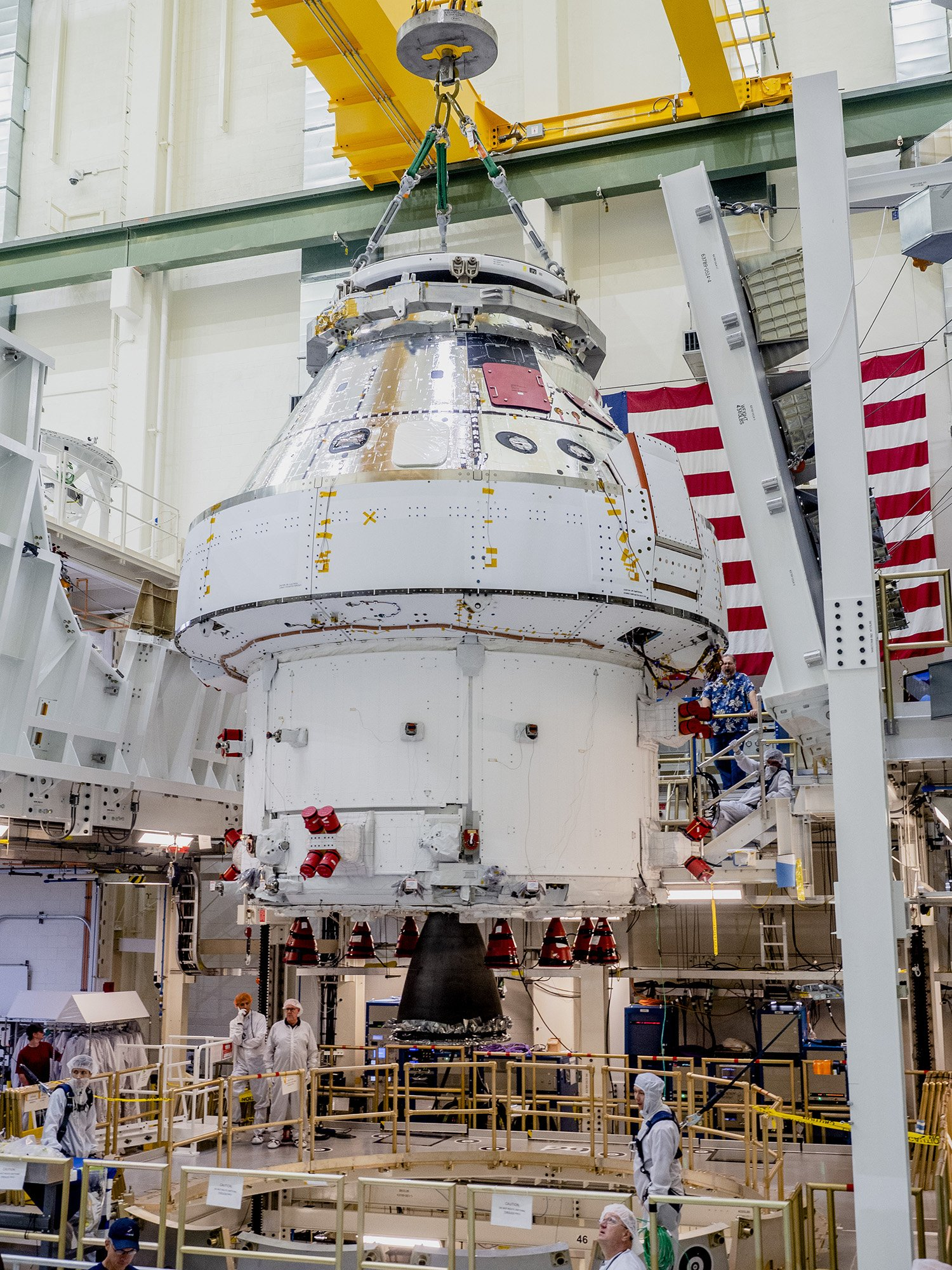
Completed Orion MPCV for Artemis 1 (November 2019)

== Post Constellation ==
After reviewing the Augustine Report, and following congressional testimony, the Obama administration decided to exclude Constellation from the 2011 United States federal budget. On February 1, 2010, the President's proposed budget was released, which included no funding for the project, and it became law on April 15, 2011. The Orion CEV would survive the cancellation for future mission to the Moon, near earth asteroids, and Mars. It was renamed the Orion Multipurpose Crew Vehicle as it would now be a single vehicle rather than the multiple designs originally proposed and launch on the Space Launch System. The Orion MPCV is the major crewed element of NASA's current Artemis Program. The vehicle undertook its first flight with the SLS in 2022 on Artemis I and the first crewed flight occurred in April 2026 on Artemis II. Lockheed Martin has been contracted for up to 12 vehicles.

=== Asteroid Redirect Mission ===
The Asteroid Redirect Mission (ARM), also known as the Asteroid Retrieval and Utilization (ARU) mission and the Asteroid Initiative, was a space mission proposed by NASA in 2013. The Asteroid Retrieval Robotic Mission (ARRM) spacecraft would rendezvous with a large near-Earth asteroid and use robotic arms with anchoring grippers to retrieve a 4 m (13 ft) boulder from the asteroid. It would then be visited by the Orion spacecraft in lunar orbit on Exploration Mission 5 in the mid-2020s. It was later changed so that the asteroid would be brought to the Exploration Gateway Platform where the Orion would then visit it. ARM was cancelled by the Trump administration in 2017.

=== Artemis program ===
The Artemis program is an ongoing crewed spaceflight program carried out predominately by NASA, U.S. commercial spaceflight companies, and international partners such as the European Space Agency (ESA), JAXA, and the Canadian Space Agency (CSA) with the goal of landing "the first woman and the next man" on the Moon, specifically at the lunar south pole region

by 2025. NASA sees Artemis as the next step towards the long-term goal of establishing a sustainable presence on the Moon. The Orion MPCV will be used as the main crew transport and logistics vehicle. It will be launched using the Space Launch System Block 1 and later the SLS Block 1B.

The successful April 2026 Artemis II mission flew four astronauts around the Moon.
