= NASA Authorization Act of 2005 =

Act of the United States Congress

- Other short titles: Charles "Pete" Conrad Astronomy Awards Act; George E. Brown, Jr. Near-Earth Object Survey Act
- Long title: An Act to authorize the programs of the National Aeronautics and Space Administration.
- Nicknames: National Aeronautics and Space Administration Authorization Act of 2005
- Enacted by: the 109th United States Congress
- Effective: December 30, 2005

Citations
- Public law: 109-155
- Statutes at Large: 119 Stat. 2895

Codification
- Titles amended: 42 U.S.C.: Public Health and Social Welfare
- U.S.C. sections created: 42 U.S.C. ch. 150 § 16601 et seq.

Legislative history
- Introduced in the Senate as S. 1281 by Kay Bailey Hutchison (R–TX) on June 21, 2005; Committee consideration by Senate Commerce, Science, and Transportation; Passed the Senate on September 28, 2005 (Passed); Passed the House on November 18, 2005 (Passed); Reported by the joint conference committee on December 15, 2005; agreed to by the House on December 17, 2005 (Agreed) and by the Senate on December 22, 2005 (Agreed); Signed into law by President George W. Bush on December 30, 2005

The NASA Authorization Act of 2005 is an act of the United States Congress that requires NASA to carry out a balanced set of programs in human spaceflight, in aeronautics research and development and in scientific research. It was signed by the then President George W. Bush and became Public Law 109-155 on December 30, 2005.

The act directs NASA to send robotic spacecraft to study the Moon and planets, and to study astronomy and astrophysics. It directs NASA to use research satellites to conduct earth science research and research on the Sun-Earth connection. It also directs NASA to support university research in a variety of fields. It also directs NASA, in conducting its work, to consult with other agencies including the National Science and Technology Council, work closely with the private sector, and "involve other nations to the extent appropriate."

== Vision for Space Exploration ==
The act makes into law, and establishes milestones for, the United States Vision for Space Exploration (VSE). Specifically it directs the NASA Administrator to develop a sustained human presence on the Moon with a lunar precursor program, and authorizes international collaborations in pursuit of these goals.

=== VSE milestones ===
The NASA Administrator is directed to "strive to achieve" the following milestones:

- Return Americans to the Moon no later than 2020.
- Launch the Crew Exploration Vehicle as close to 2010 as possible.
- Use the International Space Station to study the impacts of long duration stays in space on the human body.
- Enable humans to land on and return from Mars and other destinations on a timetable that is technically and fiscally possible.

== Aeronautics ==
The act requires establishment of a policy to guide U.S. aeronautics research and development programs through 2020. The act reiterates the Federal Government's interest in conducting research and development programs that:

- improve the usefulness, performance, speed, safety, and efficiency of aeronautical vehicles,
- preserve the role of the United States as a global leader in aeronautical technologies and in their application.

== Near Earth Asteroids detection ==
The act directs the Administrator to "detect, track, catalogue, and characterize the physical characteristics of near-Earth objects equal to or greater than 140 meters in diameter in order to assess the threat of such near-Earth objects to the Earth. It shall be the goal of the Survey program to achieve 90 percent completion of its nearEarth object catalogue (based on statistically predicted populations of near-Earth objects) within 15 years after the date of enactment of this Act."

== Science ==
The act directs the Administrator to develop a plan for NASA science programs through 2016. The act specifically mentions the Magnetospheric Multiscale Mission, SIM-Planet Quest, and the "Future Explorers Program".

=== Hubble repair ===
The act required NASA to plan the final mission to repair the Hubble Space Telescope.

== Budget ==
The act makes specific requirements regarding the NASA budget.

== See also ==
- NASA Authorization Act of 2010
- National Aeronautics and Space Administration Authorization Act of 2014 (H.R. 4412; 113th Congress)
