= Space policy of the Obama administration =

US federal plans for NASA post-2010

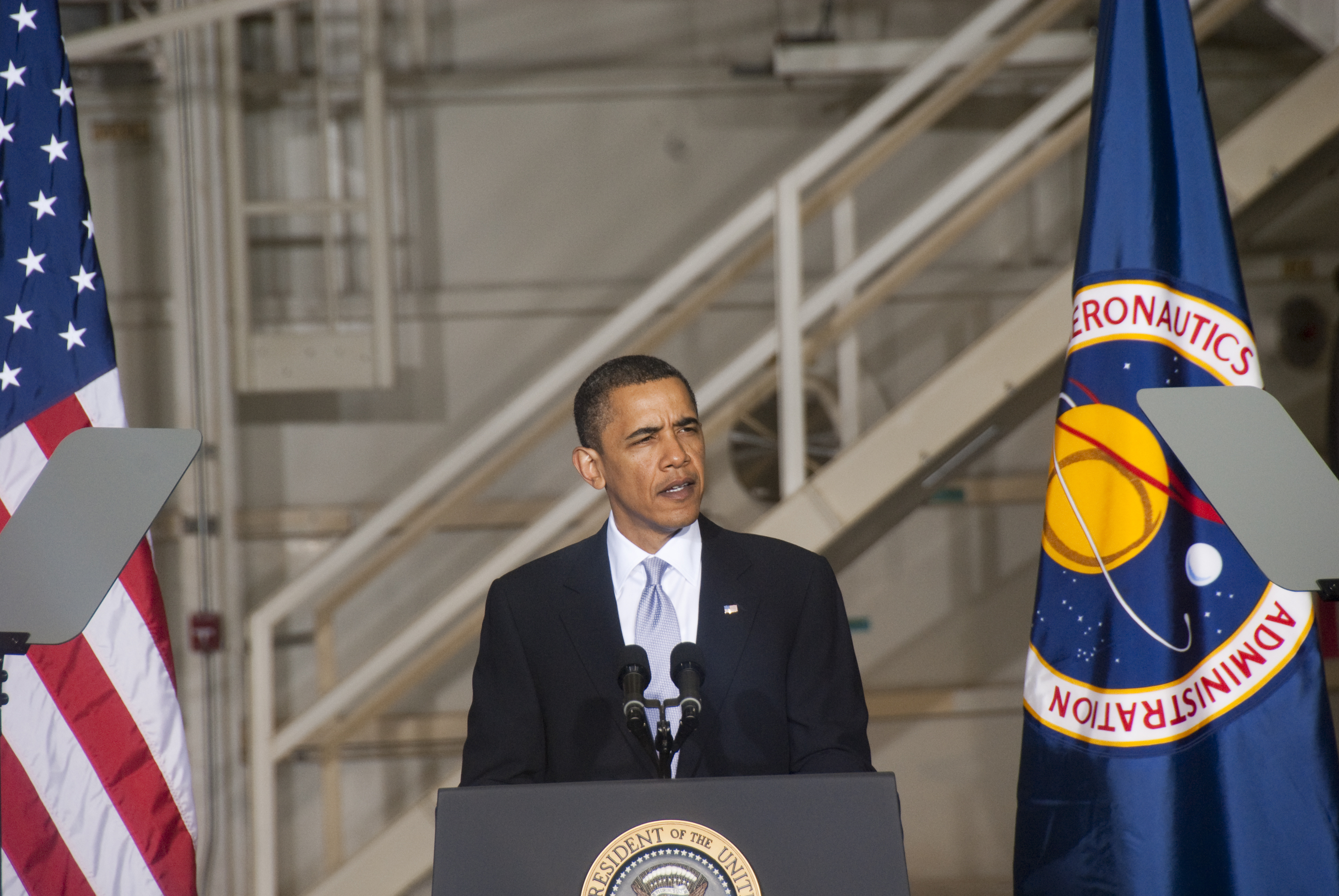
President Obama speaks at KSC's Operations and Checkout Building.

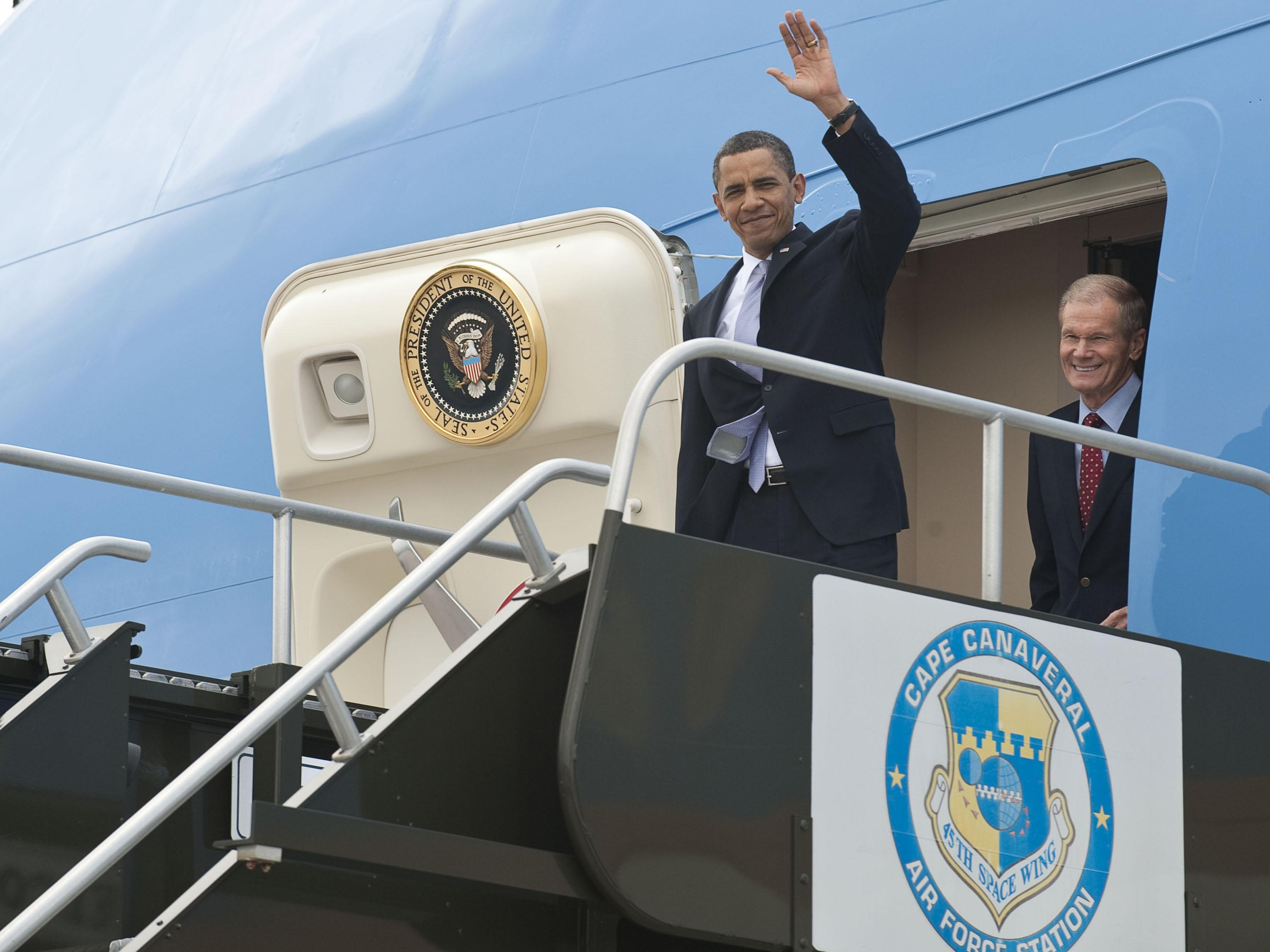
President Obama and Senator Bill Nelson arrive at the Shuttle Landing Facility.

The space policy of the Barack Obama administration was announced by U.S. president Barack Obama on April 15, 2010, at a major space policy speech at Kennedy Space Center. He committed to increasing NASA funding by $6 billion over five years and completing the design of a new heavy-lift launch vehicle by 2015 and to begin construction thereafter. He also predicted a U.S.-crewed orbital Mars mission by the mid-2030s, preceded by the Asteroid Redirect Mission by 2025. In response to concerns over job losses, Obama promised a $40 million effort to help Space Coast workers affected by the cancellation of the Space Shuttle program and Constellation program.

The Obama administration's space policy was made subsequent to the final report of the Review of United States Human Space Flight Plans Committee, which it had instituted to review the human spaceflight plans of the United States in the post-Space Shuttle era. The NASA Authorization Act of 2010, passed on October 11, 2010, enacted many of the Obama administration's space policy goals.

== Background ==
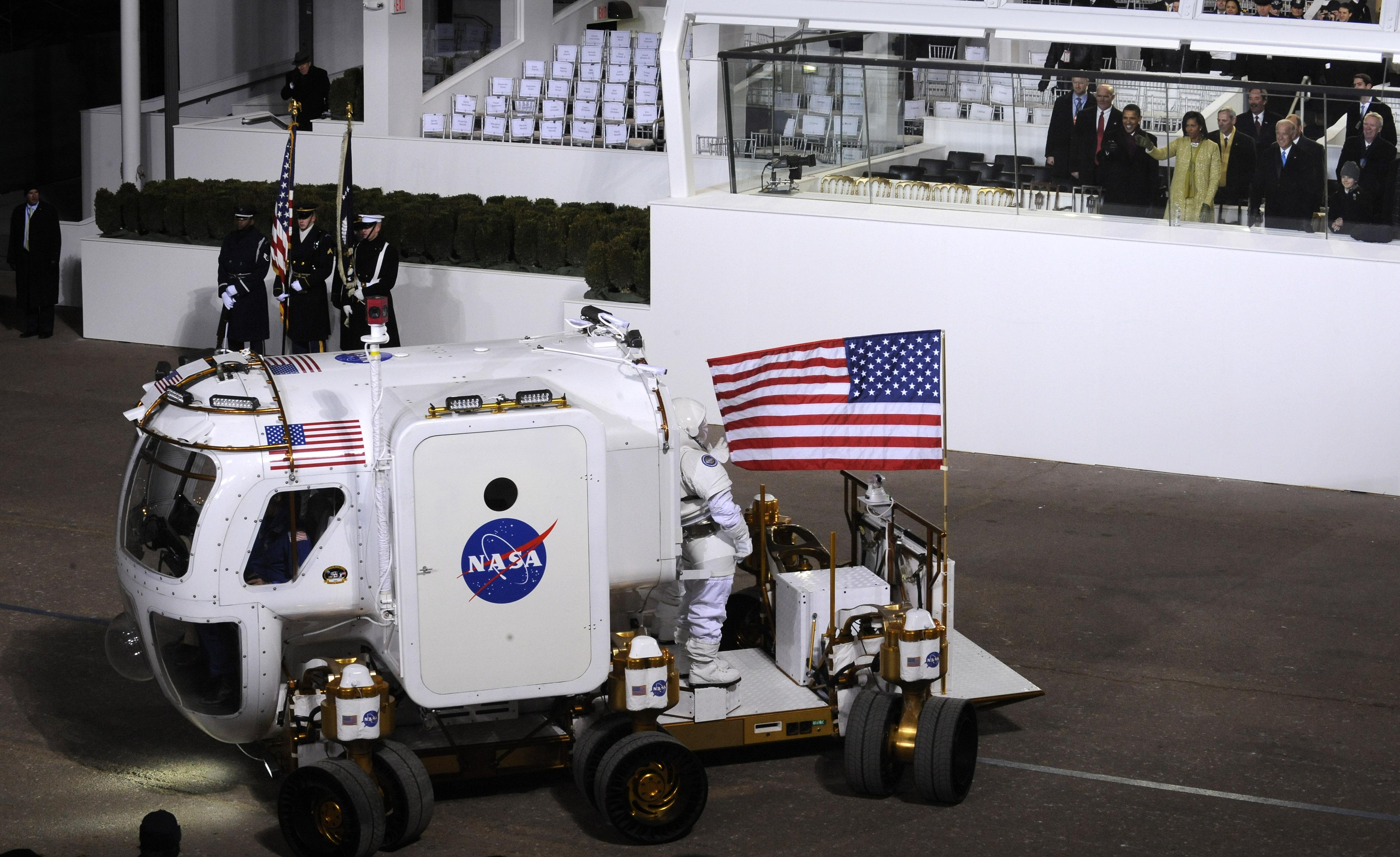
President Obama, Michelle Obama and Vice President Biden watch NASA's Lunar Electric Rover at the 2009 inaugural parade.

In November 2007, the Obama presidential campaign released a policy document delaying NASA's Constellation program by five years to fund education programs. There was concern that any delay would prolong the gap after the Space Shuttle's retirement, when the US would be dependent on the Russian government for access to the International Space Station. Other presidential candidates, including Hillary Clinton, did not support the delay.

In January 2008, the Obama campaign revised its position, supporting the immediate development of the Crew Exploration Vehicle and the Ares I rocket to narrow the gap. However, the new policy was silent on the heavy lift Ares V rocket and missions beyond low Earth orbit.

Obama gave the first major space policy speech of his campaign in Titusville, Florida in August 2008. He subsequently approved a seven-page space plan that committed to target dates for destinations beyond low Earth orbit:

He endorses the goal of sending human missions to the Moon by 2020, as a precursor in an orderly progression to missions to more distant destinations, including Mars.

Obama was noted for "having offered more specifics about his plans for NASA than any U.S. presidential candidate in history".

== Augustine Commission ==

The Obama administration instituted the Review of United States Human Space Flight Plans Committee, also known as the Augustine Commission, to review the human spaceflight plans of the United States after the time NASA had planned to retire the Space Shuttle. Their goal was to ensure the nation is on "a vigorous and sustainable path to achieving its boldest aspirations in space." The review was announced by the Office of Science and Technology Policy (OSTP) on May 7, 2009. The report was released on October 22, 2009.

The Committee judged the nine-year-old Constellation program to be so behind schedule, underfunded and over budget that meeting any of its goals would not be possible. The President removed the program from the 2010 NASA budget request and a bi-partisan congress refused to fund it any longer, effectively canceling the program. One component of the program, the Orion crew capsule, was added back into plans, but only as a rescue vehicle to complement the Russian Soyuz in returning Station crews to Earth in the event of an emergency.

In its final report, the Committee proposed three basic options for exploration beyond low Earth orbit, and appeared to favor the third option:

- Mars First, with a Mars landing, perhaps after a brief test of equipment and procedures on the Moon.
- Moon First, with lunar surface exploration focused on developing the capability to explore Mars.
- A Flexible Path to inner Solar System locations, such as lunar orbit, Lagrange points, near-Earth objects and the moons of Mars, followed by exploration of the lunar surface and/or Martian surface.

In his April 15, 2010 space policy speech at Kennedy Space Center announcing the administration's plans for NASA, none of the 3 plans outlined in the committee's final report was completely selected. The President rejected immediate plans to return to the Moon on the premise that the current plan had become nonviable. He instead promised $6 billion in additional funding and called for development of a new heavy lift rocket program to be ready for construction by 2015 with crewed missions to Mars orbit by the mid-2030s.

== Space policy speech at Kennedy Space Center ==
Obama held a space policy speech, titled "Remarks by the President on Space Exploration in the 21st Century", at the Kennedy Space Center on April 15, 2010. Attendees included then-NASA administrator and Obama appointee Charles Bolden, Apollo 11 Lunar Module Pilot Buzz Aldrin, Representative Suzanne Kosmas (D-FL), Senator Bill Nelson (D-FL), and Representative Sheila Jackson Lee (D-TX), among others.

=== Modification of Orion ===
Obama announced the modification of the Orion capsule from its original purpose as a crewed spacecraft for flights to the ISS and the Moon into an emergency escape capsule for the International Space Station, reducing American reliance on the Russian Soyuz spacecraft.

In addition, as part of this effort, we will build on the good work already done on the Orion crew capsule. I've directed Charlie Bolden to immediately begin developing a rescue vehicle using this technology, so we are not forced to rely on foreign providers if it becomes necessary to quickly bring our people home from the International Space Station. And this Orion effort will be part of the technological foundation for advanced spacecraft to be used in future deep space missions. In fact, Orion will be readied for flight right here in this room.

=== Destinations ===
The new policy changes from Vision for Space Exploration and Constellation program Moon-first approach to a variety of destinations resembling the flexible path approach:

Early in the next decade, a set of crewed flights will test and prove the systems required for exploration beyond low Earth orbit. And by 2025, we expect new spacecraft designed for long journeys to allow us to begin the first-ever crewed missions beyond the Moon into deep space. So we'll start – we'll start by sending astronauts to an asteroid for the first time in history.

Obama promoted the idea of a crewed mission to orbit Mars by the mid-2030s with a landing as a follow-up.

=== Reliance on commercially operated launch vehicles ===
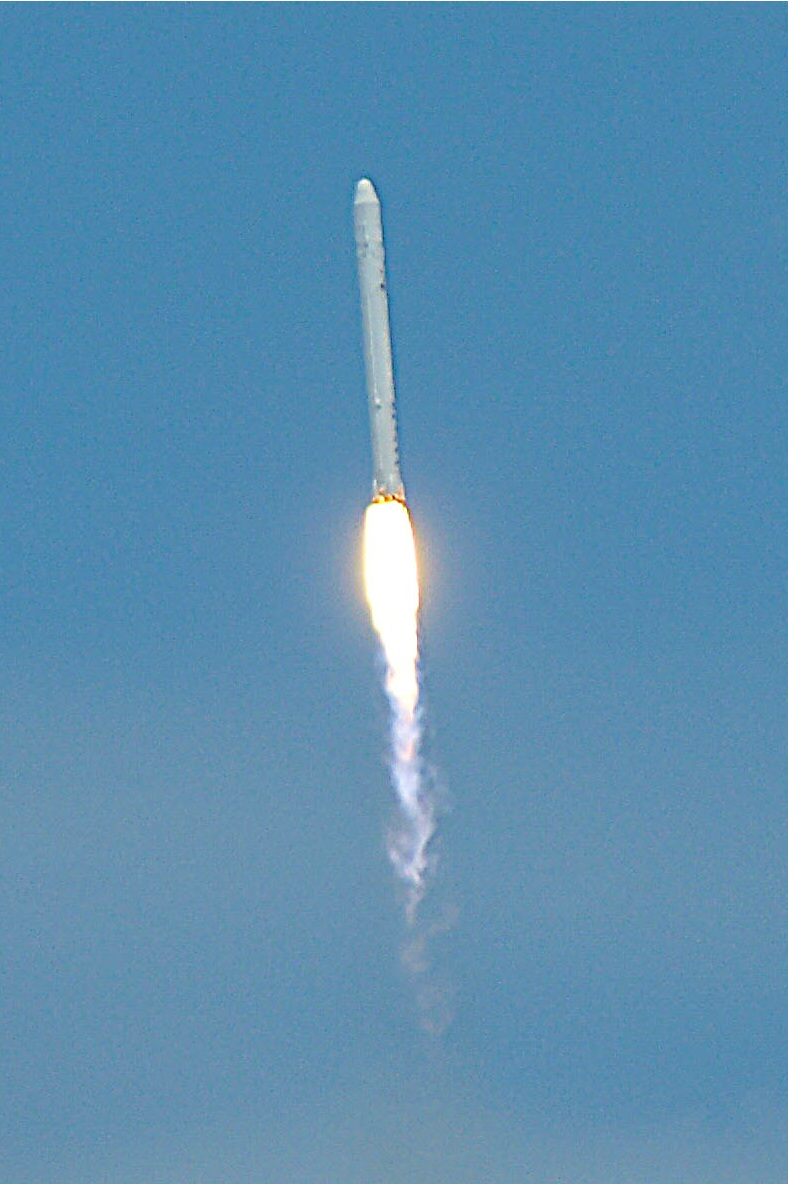
The Falcon 9 rocket Obama referenced in his speech was first launched on June 4, 2010.

In a major shift in the function of NASA in American human spaceflight, the Obama administration proposal would rely solely on launch vehicles designed, manufactured, and operated by private aerospace companies, with NASA paying for flights for government astronauts.

Prior to the speech, Obama toured the launch facilities surrounding the SpaceX Falcon 9 launch vehicle with CEO Elon Musk which has received NASA funding through the Commercial Orbital Transportation Services program and could loft NASA astronauts under the new plan. In the speech, Obama referenced the maiden flight of the Falcon 9, which would go on to launch successfully less than one and a half months after the speech:

[The] Falcon 9 rocket we just saw on the launch pad...will be tested for the very first time in the coming weeks.

=== Extension of ISS operations ===
Obama also announced an extension of funding for International Space Station operations, 90% complete by mass at the time of the speech but scheduled to be deorbited by as early as 2015 before Obama announced the extension, which provided funding through 2020.

And we will extend the life of the International Space Station likely by more than five years, while actually using it for its intended purpose: conducting advanced research that can help improve the daily lives of people here on Earth, as well as testing and improving upon our capabilities in space. This includes technologies like more efficient life support systems that will help reduce the cost of future missions. And in order to reach the space station, we will work with a growing array of private companies competing to make getting to space easier and more affordable.

=== Heavy-lift launch vehicle ===
In the speech, Obama announced the development of a new Heavy Lift Vehicle (HLV) to replace the planned Ares V, with the design planned for completion by 2015, two years prior to the Constellation plan, and construction commencing thereafter:

Next, we will invest more than $3 billion to conduct research on an advanced "heavy lift rocket"—a vehicle to efficiently send into orbit the crew capsules, propulsion systems, and large quantities of supplies needed to reach deep space. In developing this new vehicle, we will not only look at revising or modifying older models; we want to look at new designs, new materials, new technologies that will transform not just where we can go but what we can do when we get there. And we will finalize a rocket design no later than 2015 and then begin to build it. And I want everybody to understand: That's at least two years earlier than previously planned—and that's conservative, given that the previous program was behind schedule and over budget.

=== Response ===
==== Support ====
Prior to the speech, SpaceX CEO Elon Musk released a statement praising the proposal and criticizing Senators who had opposed it and former NASA administrator Michael Griffin:

Cancellation was therefore simply a matter of time and thankfully we have a president with the political courage to do the right thing sooner rather than later. We can ill afford the expense of an "Apollo on steroids", as a former NASA Administrator referred to the Ares/Orion program. A lesser President might have waited until after the upcoming election cycle, not caring that billions more dollars would be wasted. It was disappointing to see how many in Congress did not possess this courage. One senator in particular was determined to achieve a new altitude record in hypocrisy, claiming that the public option was bad in healthcare, but good in space!

Apollo 11 astronaut Buzz Aldrin released a statement in support of the plan via the White House on February 1, prior to the announcement of the 2011 federal budget, which included the changes Obama announced in the speech:

I continue to be excited about the development of commercial capabilities to send humans into low earth orbit and what this could ultimately mean in terms of allowing others to experience the transformative power of spaceflight. I can personally attest to what such an experience can do in creating a different perspective regarding our life on Earth and on our future. I applaud the President for his boldness and commitment in working to make this worthwhile dream a reality.

==== Criticism ====
Neil Armstrong, Jim Lovell, and Eugene Cernan, commanders of Apollo 11, Apollo 13, and Apollo 17 respectively, said:

- "When President Obama recently released his budget for NASA, he proposed a slight increase in total funding...the accompanying decision to cancel the Constellation program, its Ares 1 and Ares V rockets, and the Orion spacecraft, is devastating."
- "It appears that we will have wasted our current ten plus billion dollar investment in Constellation and, equally importantly, we will have lost the many years required to recreate the equivalent of what we will have discarded."
- "For The United States, the leading space faring nation for nearly half a century, to be without carriage to low Earth orbit and with no human exploration capability to go beyond Earth orbit for an indeterminate time into the future, destines our nation to become one of second or even third rate stature. While the President's plan envisages humans traveling away from Earth and perhaps toward Mars at some time in the future, the lack of developed rockets and spacecraft will assure that ability will not be available for many years."
- "Without the skill and experience that actual spacecraft operation provides, the USA is far too likely to be on a long downhill slide to mediocrity."

Robert Zubrin, president of The Mars Society and whose book The Case for Mars first proposed a Shuttle-derived heavy lift vehicle named Ares, lambasted Obama's plans in the New York Daily News:

- "Under the Obama plan, NASA will spend $100 billion on human spaceflight over the next 10 years in order to accomplish nothing"
- "Obama called for sending a crew to a near Earth asteroid by 2025. ... Had Obama not canceled the Ares V, we could have used it to perform an asteroid mission by 2016. But the President, while calling for such a flight, actually is terminating the programs that would make it possible."
- "With current in-space propulsion technology, we can do a round-trip mission to a near-Earth asteroid or a one-way transit to Mars in six months ... Holdren claims that he wants to develop a new electrically powered space thruster to speed up such trips. But without gigantic space nuclear power reactors to provide them with juice, such thrusters are useless, and the administration has no intention of developing such reactors."

=== Video ===
President Barack Obama speaks at Kennedy Space Center

== Subsequent developments ==
The Obama administration released its new formal space policy on June 28, 2010. On July 1, 2010, the NASA administrator, Charles Bolden, said in an interview with al-Jazeera: "When I became the Nasa administrator, he [Mr Obama] charged me with three things. One, he wanted me to help reinspire children to want to get into science and math; he wanted me to expand our international relationships; and third, and perhaps foremost, he wanted me to find a way to reach out to the Muslim world and engage much more with dominantly Muslim nations to help them feel good about their historic contribution to science, math, and engineering." This was the first time NASA did not specifically list space exploration as a priority.

The NASA Authorization Act of 2010, passed on October 11, 2010, authorized funds for NASA for fiscal year 2011–2013, and enacted many of his stated space policy goals. A total of $58 billion in funding is called for, spread across three years.

The 2011 budget legislation, passed in April 2011, officially terminated the Constellation program. The passage of the budget frees NASA to start working on the new initiatives.

In September 2011, details were announced of the Space Launch System, a Shuttle-Derived Launch Vehicle being developed by NASA as a replacement for the Ares I and Ares V rockets of the Constellation program.

The Obama administration cut NASA's planetary-sciences budget by 20 percent in 2013, as part of a restructuring plan, contrary to the recommendations of the National Research Council.

In January 2014 the Obama administration announced it would seek to extend the operational life of the International Space Station by four more years to 2024.

== See also ==
- Shuttle-Derived Heavy Lift Launch Vehicle (2009)
- Space policy of the United States

Preceded by Space policy of the George W. Bush administration	Space policy of the United States; 2009–2016	Succeeded by Space policy of the Donald Trump administration
