= 2011 United States federal budget =

2011 Budget of the United States federal government
- Submitted: February 1, 2010
- Submitted by: Barack Obama
- Submitted to: 111th Congress
- Passed: April 15, 2011 (Pub.L. 112-10)
- Country: United States
- Total revenue: $2.567 trillion (requested) $2.303 trillion (actual); 15.0% of GDP (actual)
- Total expenditures: $3.834 trillion (requested) $3.603 trillion (actual); 23.4% of GDP (actual)
- Deficit: $1.645 trillion (requested); 10.9% of GDP $1.30 trillion (actual); 8.5% of GDP (actual)
- Debt: $14.764 trillion (at fiscal end); 96.0% of GDP
- GDP: $15.379 trillion
- Website: Office of Management and Budget

The 2011 United States federal budget was the budget to fund government operations for the fiscal year 2011. The budget was the subject of a spending request by President Barack Obama. The actual appropriations for Fiscal Year 2011 had to be authorized by the Congress before they could take effect, according to the U.S. budget process.

No budget was passed by the September 30 deadline, and the government was funded by a series of seven continuing resolutions, which continued funding at or near 2010 levels. The budget negotiations culminated in early April 2011, with a tense legislative standoff leading to speculation that the nation would face its first government shutdown since 1995. However, a deal containing $38.5 billion in cuts from 2010 funding levels was reached with just hours remaining before the deadline. The 2011 budget was enacted on April 15, 2011, as Public Law 112-10, the Department of Defense and Full-Year Continuing Appropriations Act, 2011.

== Budget proposals ==
President Barack Obama proposed his 2011 budget during February 2010. He has indicated that jobs, health care, clean energy, education, and infrastructure will be priorities. Total requested spending is $3.83 trillion and the federal deficit is forecast to be $1.56 trillion in 2010 and $1.27 trillion in 2011. Total debt is budgeted to increase from $11.9 trillion in FY2009, to $13.8 trillion in FY2010, and $15.1 trillion in FY2011.

=== Research and development funding ===
There was considerable debate on funding levels for science research by the federal government. The Obama administration's policy has been to support increases in research funding levels, including doubling the budgets of the National Science Foundation (NSF), Department of Energy Office of Science (DOE SC), and National Institute of Standards and Technology (NIST) from their 2006 levels by 2017, and President Obama strongly featured innovation as a means for revitalizing the United States economy in his 2011 State of the Union Address. The Obama administration's fiscal year 2013 budget request included increases from the FY2011 budget by $232 million for the National Institutes of Health (NIH), $340 million for the NSF, $1.8 billion for DOE discretionary spending, and $104 million for NIST. Although there has been a budget decrease for the National Aeronautics and Space Administration (NASA) by $192 million (1.1%) since 2011.

However, the Republican majority in the United States House of Representatives has stated a focus on the principles of deficit reduction and fiscal conservatism, on which they campaigned in the 2010 elections where they made large gains in representation in Congress. House Republicans promote their plan as the largest reduction in discretionary spending in the history of Congress, saying that they have "weeded out excessive, unnecessary, and wasteful spending, making tough choices to prioritize programs based on their effectiveness and benefit to the American people" with the goal of "returning our nation to a sustainable financial path." They have thus proposed deep cuts to science research budgets, including cuts in fiscal year 2011 of $1.6 billion from the NIH, $400 million from the NSF, and $900 million from DOE SC.

The deal reached on the 2011 budget in early April 2011 resulted in modest cuts to science programs, much less than the earlier proposals by House Republicans. NIH funding was cut by about $310 million, the NSF by about $68 million, and DOE SC by $35 million.

== Legislation ==
Beginning in September 2010, Congress passed a series of continuing resolutions to fund the government.

- Continuing Appropriations Act, 2011, funding from October 1, 2010, through December 3, 2010, passed on September 29, 2010. (Pub.L. 111-242)
- Joint resolution making further continuing appropriations for fiscal year 2011, and for other purposes, funding through December 18, 2010, passed on December 2, 2010. (Pub. L. 111–290 (text) (PDF))
- Joint resolution making further continuing appropriations for fiscal year 2011, and for other purposes, funding through December 21, 2010, passed on December 17, 2010. (Pub. L. 111–317 (text) (PDF))
- Continuing Appropriations and Surface Transportation Extensions Act, 2011, funding through March 4, 2011, passed on December 21, 2010. (Pub. L. 111–322 (text) (PDF))
- Further Continuing Appropriations Amendments, 2011, funding through March 18, 2011, passed on March 2, 2011. (Pub.L. 112-4) This resolution cut $4 billion from 2010 spending levels.
- Additional Continuing Appropriations Amendments, 2011, funding through April 8, 2011, passed on March 16, 2011. (Pub.L. 112-6) This resolution cut an additional $6 billion from 2010 spending levels.
- Further Additional Continuing Appropriations Amendments, 2011, funding through April 15, 2011, passed on April 9, 2011. (Pub.L. 112-8) This continuing resolution followed a deal on the full annual budget which was made with just hours remaining before a government shutdown. It itself contains an additional $2 billion in cuts. Democrats had previously rejected a Republican-backed resolution passed by the House before the deal, which would have funded the government for another week and cut an additional $12 billion from 2010 levels.

It was widely anticipated that a government shutdown on April 8, 2011, was possible if a budget resolution or a seventh continuing resolution was not passed by the expiration of the sixth continuing resolution on April 8, 2011, which would have caused the furlough of 800,000 out of 2 million civilian federal employees. However, a deal was reached with just hours remaining before the deadline, averting the shutdown. The deal included $38.5 billion in cuts from what had been budgeted for 2010, in addition to another $10 billion in cuts that had been imposed in some of the continuing resolutions. However, the April 13 Congressional Budget Office estimate showed that, compared with then-current spending rates, the spending bill would cut federal outlays from non-war accounts by just $352 million through Sept. 30. About $8 billion in immediate cuts to domestic programs and foreign aid were offset by nearly equal increases in defense spending.

== Major initiatives ==
The following initiatives were enacted in the final budget legislation:

- The Bush tax cuts in 2001 and 2003 were scheduled to expire if no action was taken. The Obama administration had proposed that the tax cuts would be allowed to expire only for individuals earning over $200,000 and families earning over $250,000. However, in December 2010 Congress along with President Obama struck a deal, the Tax Relief, Unemployment Insurance Reauthorization, and Job Creation Act of 2010, to extend the said Bush tax cuts for another two years through the 2012 fiscal year. Current tax rates would remain as is for everyone across the board but payroll taxes would be lowered and the social security tax would be lowered by two percentage points.
- The budget allows NASA to terminate the Constellation program, a change which had already been announced by the Obama administration and authorized by Congress. The passage of the budget frees NASA to start working on the new initiatives, without making major cutbacks to overall NASA funding.
- A clause inserted into the budget legislation by Representative Frank Wolf prohibits NASA and the White House Office of Science and Technology Policy from any joint scientific activity with China for the remainder of the 2011 fiscal year. This prohibition resulted in Chinese journalists being denied access to the launching of Space Shuttle Endeavour on the mission STS-134.

The following major changes were proposed to federal programs, but not necessarily enacted:

- The proposed budget contains $4 billion for the creation of a national infrastructure bank called the "National Infrastructure Innovation and Finance Fund." This proposal is similar to the National Infrastructure Reinvestment Bank initiative previously proposed by Congress.
- The budget would cut $40 billion of tax subsidies for oil, gas and coal companies over the next decade.
- Banks would face a $90 billion tax in total over 10 years.
- The Research & Experimentation Tax Credit would be made permanent.
- Appropriates $36 billion to the Department of Energy to distribute in loan guarantees for construction of new nuclear power plants and reactors. As part of the Energy Policy Act of 2005, this appropriation is to provide funding for 80% of the total cost of construction at approved nuclear sites in the coming years.

== Total revenues and spending ==
Total receipts (in billions of dollars):

2011 Actual Receipts by Source
1. Individual income tax (44.0%)
2. Social Security/other payroll tax (37.1%)
3. Corporate income tax (9.10%)
4. Deposits of earnings and Federal Reserve System (3.70%)
5. Excise tax (3.40%)
6. Customs duties (1.30%)
7. Estate and gift taxes (0.60%)
8. Other miscellaneous receipts (0.90%)

Source	Requested	Enacted	Actual
Individual income tax	1,121	956	1,091
Corporate income tax	297	198	181
Social Security and other payroll tax	934	806	818
Excise tax	74	74	72
Estate and gift taxes	25	12	7
Customs duties	27	28	30
Deposits of earnings and Federal Reserve System	79	80	83
Allowance for jobs initiatives	−25	-	-
Allowance for health reform	16	-	-
Other miscellaneous receipts	17	19	20
Total	2,105	2,174	2,303

In the Obama administration's initial spending request, the federal budget for 2011 was originally projected at $3.83 trillion in total spending.

The projected 2011 gross domestic product is listed at $13.519 trillion (in 2005 dollars).

As of January 2011, the Congressional Budget Office (CBO) projected that if current laws remain unchanged, the federal budget will show a deficit of close to $1.5 trillion, or 9.8 percent of GDP. The CBO projects total revenues of $2.228 trillion and total outlays of $3.708 trillion for a deficit of $1.48 trillion for 2011. The deficits in CBO's baseline projections drop markedly over the next few years as a share of output and average 3.1 percent of GDP from 2014 to 2021. Those projections, however, are based on the assumption that tax and spending policies unfold as specified in current law. Consequently, they understate the budget deficits that would occur if many policies currently in place were continued, rather than allowed to expire as scheduled under current law.

On February 14, 2011, President Obama released his 2012 federal budget request. The report updated the projected 2011 deficit to $1.590 trillion. This is based on estimated revenues of $2.228 trillion and outlays of $3.818 trillion.

The enacted 2011 budget called for $2.314 trillion in receipts and $3.630 trillion in outlays, according to the September 1, 2011 Mid-Session Review.

The 2011 Financial Report of the United States Government was released on December 23, 2011, showing a net operating cost and cash-based budget deficit for the year of $1.3 trillion. According to the Government Accountability Office, the 'accrual deficit provides more information on the longer-term implications of the government's annual operations'. Gross costs fell from $4,472 billion in 2010 to $3,998 billion, largely due to the release of accounting provisions (estimates of future liabilities), while total taxes and other revenues rose from $2,217 billion to $2,364 billion. The GAO was unable to provide an audit opinion on the 2011 financial statements due to 'widespread material internal control weaknesses, significant uncertainties, and other limitations'. As in 2010, the GAO cited as the principal obstacle to its provision of an audit opinion 'serious financial management problems at the Department of Defense that made its financial statements unauditable', highlighting also recurrent issues at the Department of Homeland Security.
