= Earth orbit rendezvous =

Method for conducting round trip human flights to the Moon

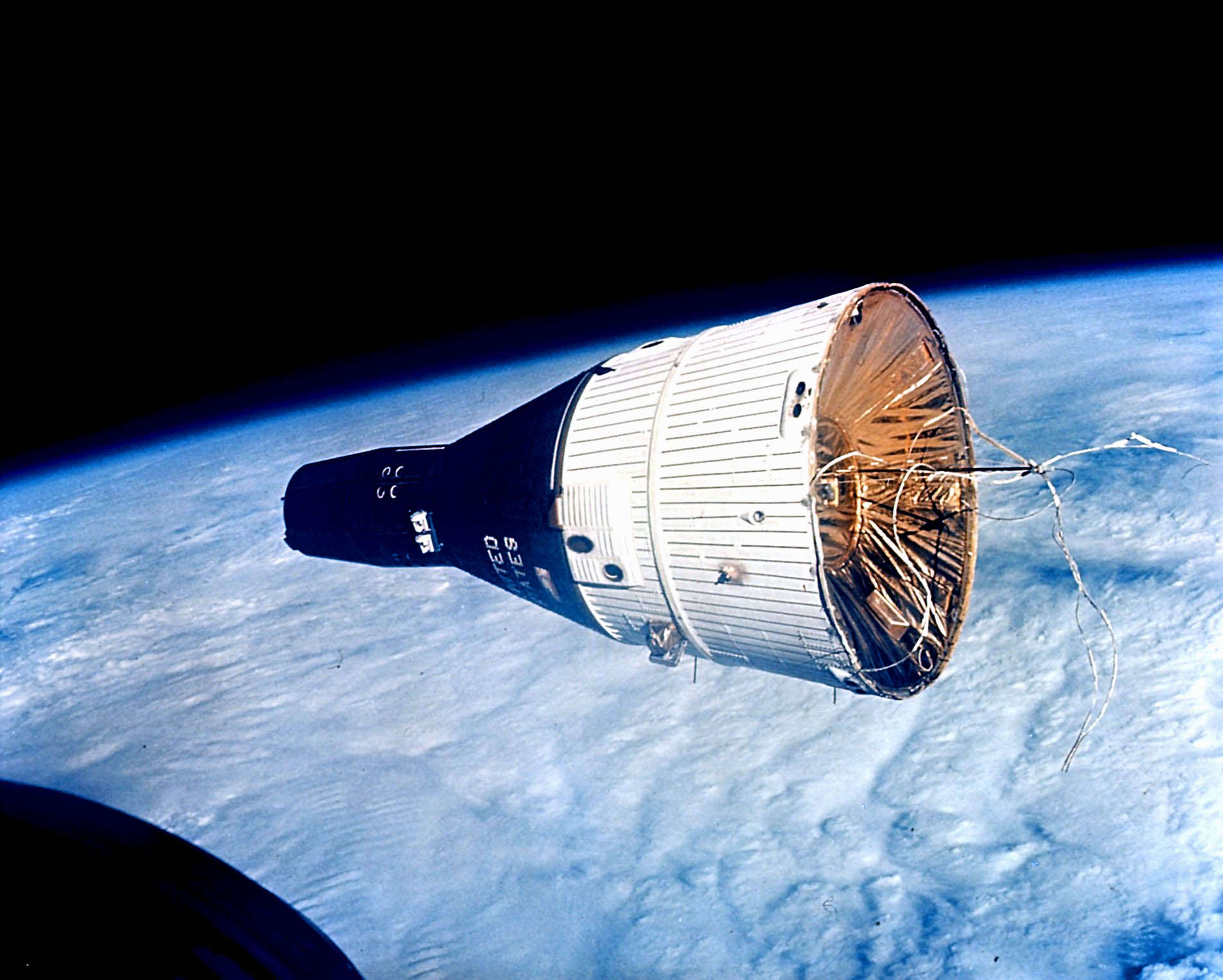
Gemini 7 as seen from Gemini 6 during their rendezvous in Earth orbit in 1965 (NASA)

Earth orbit rendezvous (EOR) is a method for conducting round trip human flights to the Moon, involving the use of space rendezvous to assemble, and possibly fuel, components of a translunar vehicle in low Earth orbit. It was considered as an alternative to direct ascent but ultimately rejected in favor of lunar orbit rendezvous (LOR) for NASA's Apollo program of the 1960s and 1970s, mainly because EOR requires a spacecraft large enough to make the round trip from Earth orbit to the moon to also maneuver a soft landing on the lunar surface (while LOR allows engineers to design a much smaller, specialized vehicle which only needs to travel the distance from lunar orbit to the surface). The two main proposed methodologies for EOR were: the in-space assembly of fueled spacecraft modules via docking techniques; and the in-space refueling of fully assembled spacecraft. American in 1965 believed that this was the preferred approach adopted by the Soviet Union for achieving human lunar missions.

Three decades later, it was planned to be used for Project Constellation, until that program's cancellation in October 2010.

== Gemini and Agena target vehicle ==
The Agena target vehicle (ATV) was used for testing Earth orbit rendezvous in the NASA Gemini Program. Gemini 6 and Gemini 7 rendezvoused in orbit in 1965, but without Agena. Next, Gemini 8 successfully docked with the Agena on March 16, 1966. The Agena-Gemini rendezvous also achieved other objectives in later Gemini launches, including docked orbital maneuvering (Gemini 10 and Gemini 11), inspection of the abandoned Gemini 8 ATV (Gemini 10) and space walks (Gemini 12).

== Apollo ==
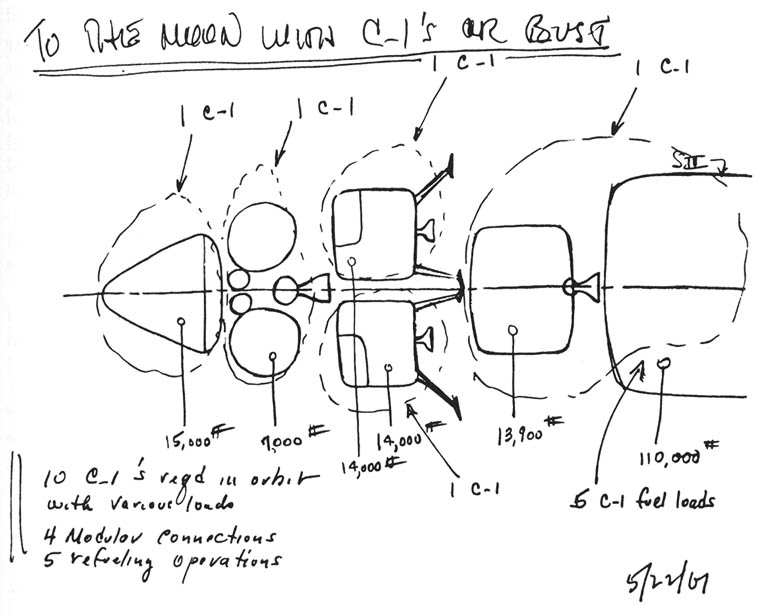
1961 sketch showing 10 C-1 launches required to assemble in Earth orbit an Apollo lunar landing mission.

The EOR proposal for Apollo consisted of using a series of small rockets half the size of a Saturn V to put different components of a spacecraft to go to the Moon in orbit around the Earth, then assemble them in orbit. Experiments of Project Gemini involving docking with the Agena target vehicle were designed partly to test the feasibility of this program.

In the end, NASA employed the Lunar Orbit Rendezvous for the Apollo Program: a Saturn V would simultaneously lift both the Apollo Command and Lunar Modules into low Earth orbit, and then the Saturn V third stage would fire again (Trans-lunar injection) to send both spacecraft to the Moon.

== Constellation ==
This mode had been revived for Project Constellation as the Earth Departure Stage (EDS) and Altair (LSAM), which would be launched into low Earth orbit on the Ares V rocket. The EDS and Altair would be met by the separately launched Orion (CEV). Once joined in low Earth orbit, the three would then travel out to the Moon, and the Orion/Altair combination would fly a lunar orbit rendezvous flight pattern.
