= Constellation program =

Cancelled 2005–2010 NASA human spaceflight program

Program overview
- Country: United States
- Organization: NASA
- Purpose: Crewed orbital flight; Crewed lunar exploration; Crewed Mars exploration
- Status: Cancelled

Program history
- Cost: Estimated: $230 billion (2004) Actual: $9 billion (2010)
- Duration: 2004–2010
- First flight: MLAS; July 8, 2009
- Last flight: Ares I-X; October 28, 2009
- Successes: 2
- Launch sites: Kennedy Space Center Launch Complex 39; White Sands

Vehicle information
- Crewed vehicles: Altair; Orion
- Launch vehicles: Ares I; Ares V

The Constellation program (abbreviated CxP) was a crewed spaceflight program developed by NASA, the space agency of the United States, from 2005 to 2009. The major goals of the program, in which no crewed missions flew before its cancellation, were "completion of the International Space Station" and a "return to the Moon no later than 2020" with a crewed flight to the planet Mars as the ultimate goal. The program's logo reflected the three stages of the program: the Earth (ISS), the Moon, and finally Mars—while the Mars goal also found expression in the name given to the program's booster rockets: Ares (the Greek equivalent of the Roman god Mars). The technological aims of the program included the regaining of significant astronaut experience beyond low Earth orbit and the development of technologies necessary to enable sustained human presence on other planetary bodies.

Constellation began in response to the goals laid out in the Vision for Space Exploration under NASA Administrator Sean O'Keefe and President George W. Bush. O'Keefe's successor, Michael D. Griffin, ordered a complete review, termed the Exploration Systems Architecture Study, which reshaped how NASA would pursue the goals laid out in the Vision for Space Exploration, and its findings were formalized by the NASA Authorization Act of 2005. The Act directed NASA to "develop a sustained human presence on the Moon, including a robust precursor program to promote exploration, science, commerce and US preeminence in space, and as a stepping stone to future exploration of Mars and other destinations." Work began on this revised Constellation Program, to send astronauts first to the International Space Station, then to the Moon, and then to Mars and beyond.

Subsequent to the findings of the Augustine Committee in 2009 that the Constellation Program could not be executed without substantial increases in funding, on February 1, 2010, President Barack Obama proposed to cancel the program, effective with the passage of the U.S. 2011 fiscal year budget. He then revised administration statements in a major space policy speech at Kennedy Space Center on April 15, 2010. On October 11, the signing of the NASA Authorization Act of 2010 shelved the program, with Constellation contracts remaining in place until Congress would act to overturn the previous mandate. In 2011, NASA adopted the design of its new Space Launch System.

== Designs ==
One of the main goals of Constellation was the development of spacecraft and booster vehicles to replace the Space Shuttle. NASA had already begun designing two boosters, the Ares I and Ares V, when the program was created. Ares I was designed for the sole purpose of launching mission crews into orbit, while Ares V would have been used to launch other hardware which required a heavier lift capacity than the Ares I booster provided. In addition to these two boosters, NASA designed other spacecraft for use during Constellation, including the Orion crew capsule, the Earth Departure Stage secondary booster, and the Altair lunar lander.

=== Vehicles ===
==== Orion ====
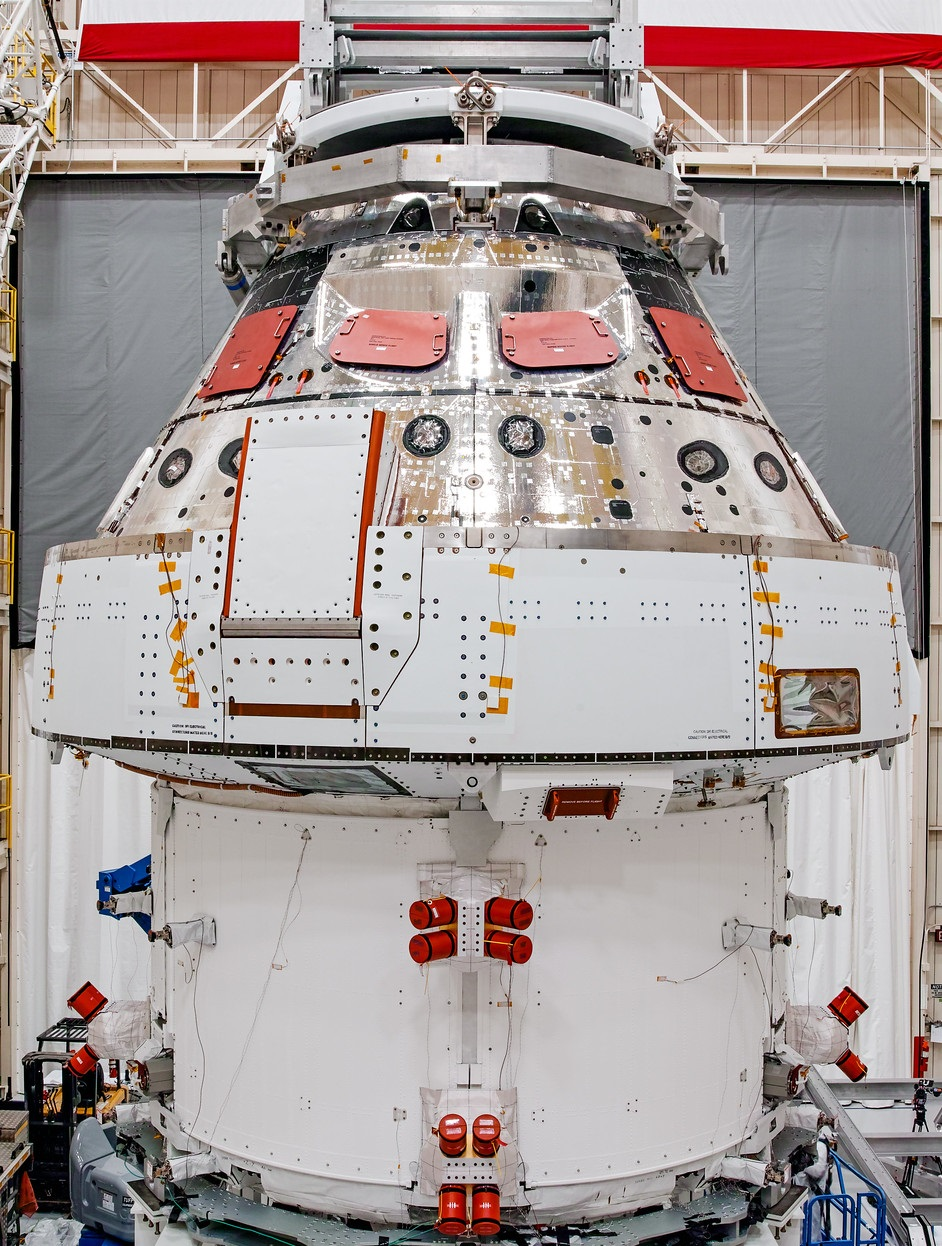
Orion spacecraft as of December 2019

The Orion spacecraft was designed for the Constellation program as a crew compartment for use in low Earth orbit. Lockheed Martin was selected as the prime contractor for the Orion project on August 31, 2006, and Boeing was selected to build its primary heat shield on September 15, 2006. NASA initially planned to develop different Orion capsules tailored for specific missions. The Block I Orion was to be used for International Space Station missions and other Earth orbit missions, while the Block II and III variants were designed for deep-space exploration.

Orion's design consists of three main parts: a crew module (CM) similar to the Apollo command module, but capable of sustaining four to six crew members; a cylindrical service module (SM) containing the primary propulsion systems and consumable supplies; and the Launch Abort System (LAS), which provides capability for the astronauts and Crew Module to escape from the launch vehicle should problems arise during launch ascent. The Orion Crew Module is designed to be reusable, allowing NASA to construct a fleet of Orion crew modules.

Despite the cancellation of the Constellation program, development of the Orion spacecraft continues, with a test launch performed on December 5, 2014. Orion flew aboard Artemis I in 2022 and Artemis II in 2026, with plans to fly on several subsequent missions.

==== Altair ====
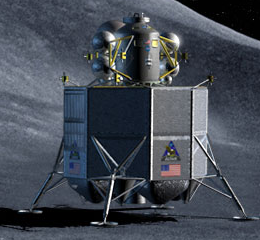
Design for Altair

Altair (formerly known as the Lunar Surface Access Module, LSAM) was designed to be the main transport vehicle for astronauts on lunar missions. The Altair design was much larger than its predecessor, the Apollo Lunar Module, at almost five times the volume, occupying a total of 1,120 cubic feet (32 m^{3}) compared with the Apollo lander's 235 cubic feet (6.7 m^{3}). It was to stand 32 feet (9.8 m) tall and span 49 feet (15 m) wide from tip to tip of the landing gear.

Like its predecessor, the Altair design consists of two parts: an ascent stage which houses the four-person crew; and a descent stage consisting of the landing gear, and storage for the majority of the crew's consumables (oxygen and water) and for scientific equipment. Unlike the Lunar Module, Altair was designed to land in the lunar polar regions favored by NASA for future lunar base construction. Altair, like the Lunar Module, was not designed to be reusable, and the ascent stage would be discarded after use.

The Altair descent stage was to be powered by four RL10 rocket engines, which are also those used in the Centaur upper stage of the Atlas V rocket. Unlike the current RL10 engines in use, these newer RL10s were to have the ability to throttle down to as low as 10% rated thrust (the older specifications allow for 20%), thus allowing the use of Altair for both the lunar orbit insertion (LOI) and landing stages of lunar missions. The ascent stage was designed to be powered by a single engine, likely a hypergolic engine similar or identical to the main engine of the Orion CSM, which would use the descent stage as both a launchpad and a platform for future base construction. Alternately, there was a small possibility that the original plan of using LOX/CH_{4}–fueled engines on board the Block II (lunar) Orion CSM and Altair ascent stage would have been adopted.

=== Propulsion ===
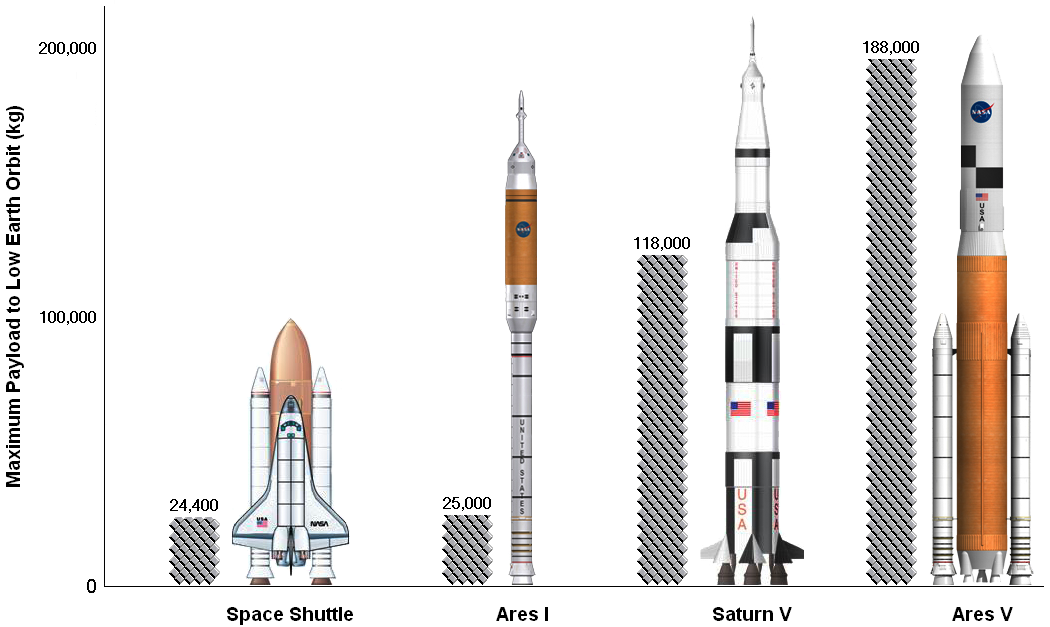
Comparison of maximum payload to low Earth orbit.: 1. Space Shuttle payload includes crew and cargo. 2. Ares I payload includes only crew and inherent craft. 3. Saturn V payload includes crew, inherent craft and cargo. 4. Ares V payload includes only cargo and inherent craft.

NASA planned to use two separate boosters for the Constellation Program missions – the Ares I for crew and the Ares V for cargo. This would have allowed the two launch vehicles to be optimized for their respective missions, and allowed a much higher total lift for the Ares V without being cost-prohibitive. The Constellation Program thus combined the Lunar Orbit Rendezvous method adopted by the Apollo program's lunar missions with the Earth Orbit Rendezvous method which had also been considered.

The name Ares (the Greek god called Mars in Roman mythology) was chosen for the boosters as a reference to the project's goal of landing on Mars. The numbers I and V were chosen to pay homage to the Saturn rockets of the 1960s.

==== Ares I ====
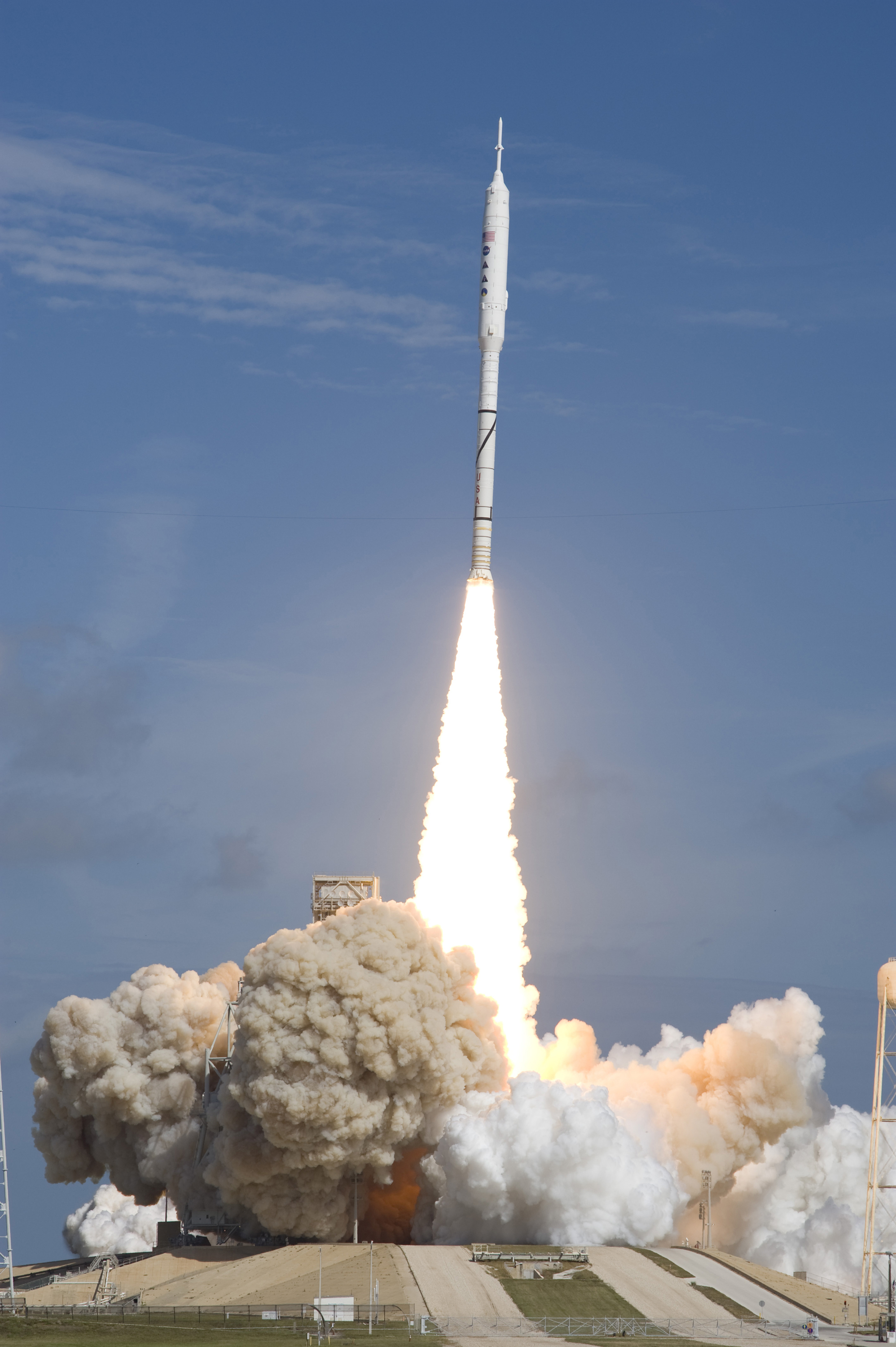
The launch of Ares I prototype, Ares I-X on October 28, 2009

The Orion spacecraft would have been launched into a low Earth orbit by the Ares I rocket (the "Stick"), developed by Alliant Techsystems, Rocketdyne, and Boeing. Formerly referred to as the Crew Launch Vehicle (CLV), the Ares I consisted of a single Solid Rocket Booster (SRB) derived in part from the primary boosters used in the Space Shuttle system, connected at its upper end by an interstage support assembly to a new liquid-fueled second stage powered by a J-2X rocket engine. NASA selected the Ares designs for their anticipated overall safety, reliability and cost-efficiency.

NASA began developing the Ares I low Earth orbit launch vehicle (analogous to Apollo's Saturn IB), returning to a development philosophy used for the original Saturn I, test-launching one stage at a time, which George Mueller had firmly opposed and abandoned in favor of "all-up" testing for the Saturn V. As of May 2010, the program got as far as launching the first Ares I-X first-stage flight on October 28, 2009 and testing the Orion launch abort system before its cancellation.

==== Ares V ====
Ares V would have had a maximum lift capacity of about 188 metric tons (414,000 lb) to low Earth orbit (LEO), compared to the Space Shuttle's capacity of 24.4 metric tons (54,000 lb), and the Saturn V's 118 metric tons (260,000 lb). The Ares V would have carried about 71 metric tons (157,000 lb) to the Moon, versus the Saturn V's 45 metric tons (99,000 lb) lunar payload.

The Ares V design consisted of six RS-68 engines with assistance from a pair of 5.5-segment SRBs. Five RS-25 engines were originally planned for the Ares V, but the RS-68 engines are more powerful and less complex and therefore less expensive than the SSMEs. The Ares V would have flown for the first eight minutes of powered flight, then the Earth Departure Stage would have placed itself and the Altair spacecraft into low Earth orbit while awaiting the arrival of the Orion. Toward the end of the program, it became apparent that the ablatively-cooled RS-68B engines would not withstand the heat from the solid rocket boosters at launch, and NASA began again to consider using RS-25 engines instead of upgrading the RS-68 to be regeneratively-cooled.

==== Earth Departure Stage ====
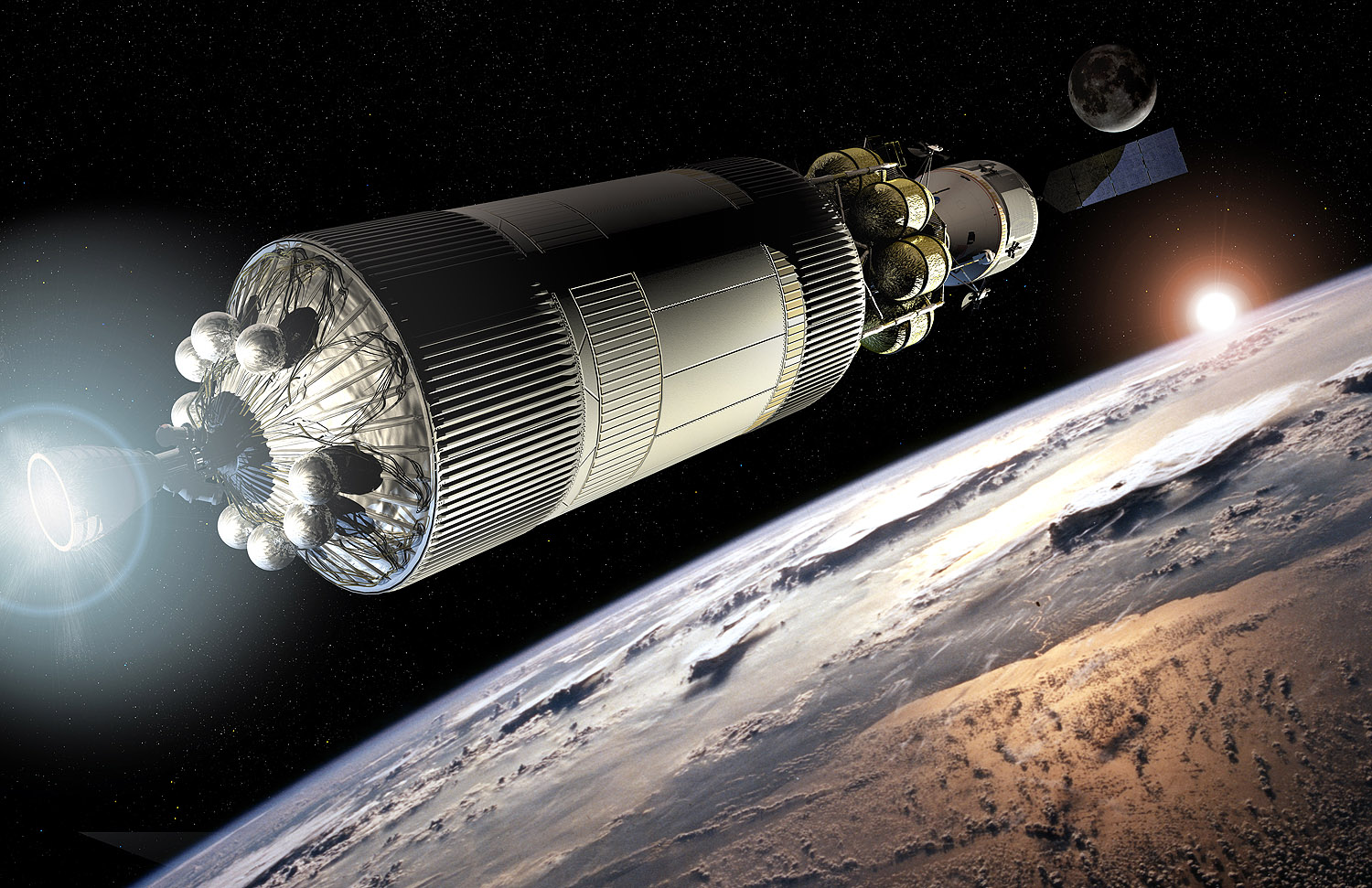
Earth Departure Stage

The Earth Departure Stage (EDS) was the propulsion system designed to put the Altair upper stage on a lunar trajectory from within low Earth orbit. It was designed as the second liquid-fueled stage of the Ares V rocket. The Orion spacecraft would have been launched separately by Ares I, and then met and docked with the Ares V-launched EDS/Altair combination, delivering the crew and configuring the spacecraft for its journey to the Moon in a process known as Earth orbit rendezvous.

=== Comparison to Apollo and Space Shuttle designs ===
NASA planned to use the first vehicles developed in the Constellation Program for Earth-orbit tasks formerly undertaken by the Space Shuttle. But unlike the X-33 and other programs intended to replace the Shuttle, Constellation reused concepts from the Apollo and Space Shuttle programs.

The shape of the Orion command module closely resembles the aerodynamic shape of the Apollo command and service module. However, in other areas Orion employs updated technology. The design of the launch vehicle taking Orion into orbit, the Ares I, employs many concepts from the Apollo program.

The design of the J-2X engine intended for use on the Ares V booster rocket was originally to be similar to the J-2 engine of the Apollo-era Saturn V and Saturn IB rockets. In designing the J-2X, NASA engineers visited museums, searched for Apollo-era documentation and consulted with engineers who worked on the Apollo program. "The mechanics of landing on the Moon and getting off the Moon to a large extent have been solved," said Constellation program manager Jeff Hanley. "That is the legacy that Apollo gave us." However, as the J-2X program progressed, it became apparent that, because of revised safety requirements and the growing mass of the upper stage, it was necessary to scrap the original J-2 design completely and use a completely new design for the J-2X.

Like Apollo, Constellation would have flown a lunar orbit rendezvous mission profile, but unlike Apollo, Constellation would have also employed Earth orbit rendezvous, conveying the crew to the vehicle. The lander, known as Altair, would have been launched separately on the Ares V rocket, a rocket based on both Space Shuttle and Apollo technologies. Orion would have been launched separately and would have linked up with Altair in low Earth orbit. Also, unlike Apollo, Orion would have remained uncrewed in lunar orbit while the entire crew landed on the lunar surface. Toward the end of the mission, the Altair spacecraft would have launched into lunar orbit to link up with the Orion spacecraft in lunar orbit rendezvous. Like Apollo, the Orion capsule would then have returned to Earth, re-entering the atmosphere and landing in water.

== Missions ==
Like those of the Apollo Program, Constellation program missions would involve its main vehicle, the Orion spacecraft, flying missions in low Earth orbit to service the International Space Station, and in conjunction with the Altair and Earth Departure Stage vehicles, on crewed flights to the polar regions of the Moon. There were no well-defined plans at the time of cancelation for a crewed flight to Mars, the ultimate goal of the project, but a mission to a Near-Earth asteroid was in the initial planning phase as of 2008.

=== International Space Station and low-Earth orbit flights ===
After being manufactured at private plants, the parts of the Ares I/Orion stack would be tested and assembled at the Vehicle Assembly Building at the Kennedy Space Center. Once assembly was completed and a launch date was set, the crawler-transporter would transport the completed stack, along with the launch support tower and the Mobile Launcher-1, out to LC-39B. Once the crawler-transporter reached the pad, the stack and the Launcher Platform would be left in place and the crawler-transporter removed to a safe distance.

After final safety checks, the ground crew would fill up the second stage with liquid hydrogen (LH_{2}) and liquid oxygen (LOX) fuel, and the crew, wearing all-purpose spacesuits, would enter the spacecraft three hours before liftoff. Once they were locked in, and after all systems were cleared by controllers at both the Cape and Mission Control in Houston, the Ares I would then launch.

After a two-day orbital chase, the Orion spacecraft, having jettisoned much of the initial stack during takeoff, would meet with the International Space Station. After getting the go ahead from Houston, Orion would then dock with the ISS. The six-man crew (at a maximum) would then enter the station in order to perform numerous tasks and activities for the duration of their flight, usually lasting six months, but possibly shortened to four or lengthened to eight, depending upon NASA's goals for that particular mission. Once completed, the crew would then reenter the Orion, seal itself off from the ISS, and then undock from the station.

Once the Orion reached a safe distance from the ISS, the Command Module (after having jettisoned the disposable service module) would re-enter in the same manner as all NASA spacecraft prior to the Shuttle, using the ablative heat shield to both deflect heat from the spacecraft and to slow it down from a speed of 17,500 mph (28,200 km/h) to 300 mph (480 km/h). After reentry was completed, the forward assembly would be jettisoned, and two drogue parachutes released, followed at 20,000 feet (6,100 m) by three main parachutes and airbags filled with nitrogen (N_{2}), which does not combust when exposed to heat, allowing the spacecraft to splashdown. The Command Module would then be returned to Kennedy Space Center for refurbishment for a later flight. Unlike the Apollo CM, which was used only for one flight, an Orion CM could theoretically be used up to ten times under normal operating conditions.

=== Lunar sortie flights ===
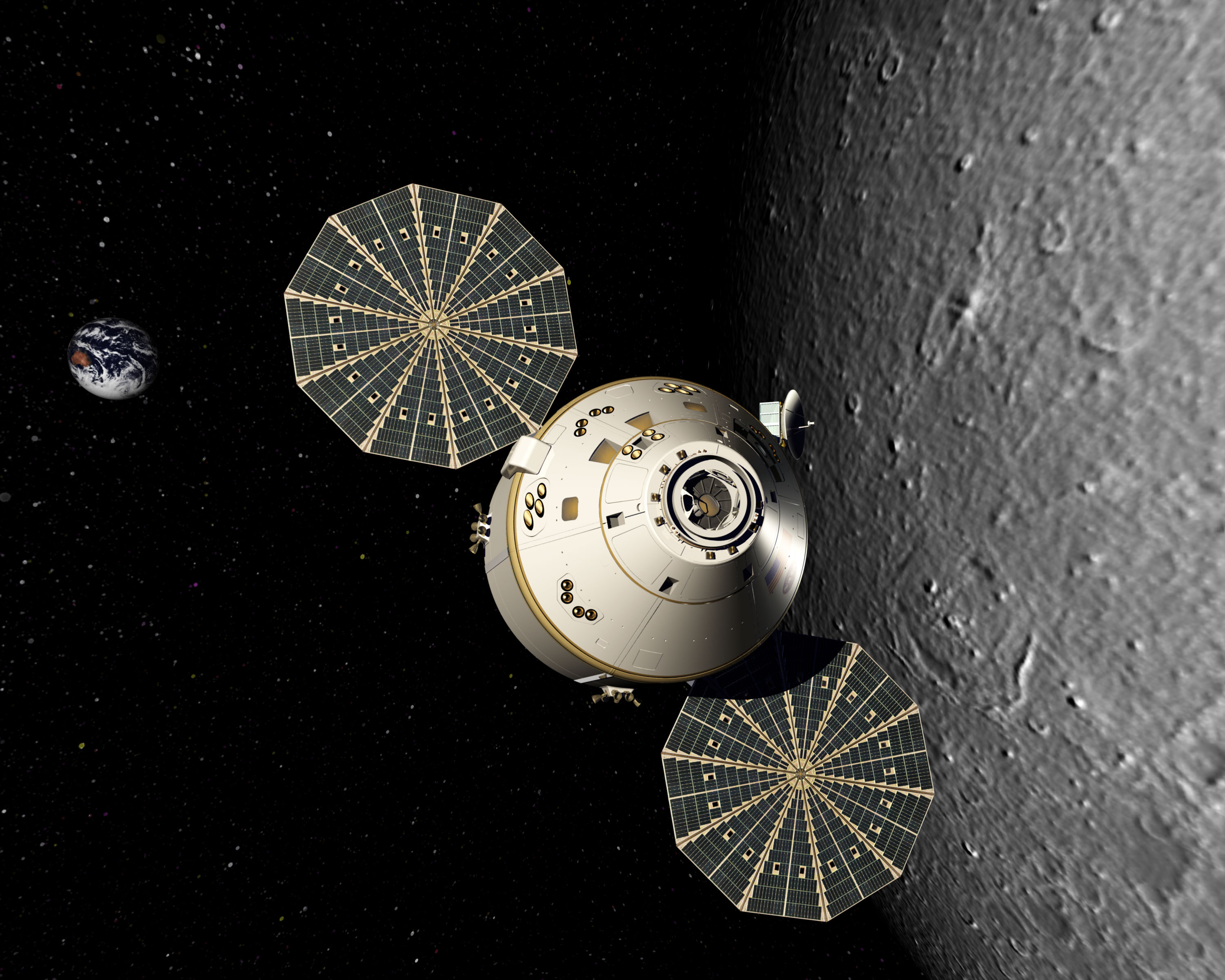
Artist's conception of the Orion spacecraft in lunar orbit

Unlike the Apollo missions, where both the Apollo command and service module and the Apollo Lunar Module were launched together on the Saturn V rocket, the crewed Orion spacecraft would be launched separately from the uncrewed EDS and lunar lander. The Ares V/Altair stack would be assembled at the Vehicle Assembly Building and then transported to LC-39A, and the Ares M/Orion stack would be transported to the adjacent Pad 39B. The Ares V/EDS/Altair stack would be launched first, into a 220 miles (360 km) high circular orbit. Approximately 90 minutes later, the Ares I/Orion would then launch with the crew into a nearly identical orbit.

The Orion would then rendezvous and dock with the Altair/EDS combination already in low-Earth orbit. After the necessary preparations for lunar flight, the EDS would fire for 390 seconds in a translunar injection (TLI) maneuver, accelerating the spacecraft to 25,000 miles per hour (40,200 km/h). After this burn, the EDS would be jettisoned.

During the three-day trans-lunar coast, the four-man crew would monitor the Orion's systems, inspect their Altair spacecraft and its support equipment, and correct their flight path as necessary to allow the Altair to land at a near-polar landing site suitable for a future lunar base. Approaching the lunar far side, the Orion/Altair combination would orient the Altair's engines forward and make the lunar orbit insertion (LOI) burn.

Once in lunar orbit, the crew would refine the trajectory and configure the Orion spacecraft for uncrewed flight, allowing all four crew members to transfer to the Altair vehicle and land on the Moon, while the Orion waits for their return. Upon receiving clearance from Mission Control, the Altair would undock from the Orion and perform an inspection maneuver, allowing ground controllers to inspect the spacecraft via live TV mounted on Orion for any visible problems that would prevent landing (on Apollo this was done by the Command Module Pilot). After receiving approval from ground controllers, the two craft would separate to a safe distance and the Altair's descent engines would fire again for powered descent to a pre-determined landing spot previously selected by uncrewed spacecraft.

Upon landing, the crew would put on their extravehicular activity (EVA) spacesuits and commence the first of five to seven lunar EVAs, collecting samples and deploying experiments. After completing their Lunar Sortie operations, the crew would then enter the Altair and fire the ascent stage engine to lift off from the surface, using the descent stage as a launchpad (and leaving it as a platform for future base construction). Upon entering orbit, the Altair would rendezvous and dock with the waiting Orion spacecraft, and the crew would then transfer, along with samples collected on the Moon, back to the Orion. After jettisoning the Altair, the crew would perform the Trans Earth Injection (TEI) burn for the return trip to Earth.

After a two-and-a-half-day coast, the crew would jettison the Service Module (allowing it to burn up in the atmosphere) and the CM would reenter the Earth's atmosphere using a special reentry trajectory designed to slow the vehicle from its speed of 25,000 miles per hour (40,200 km/h) to 300 miles per hour (480 km/h) and thus allow a Pacific Ocean splashdown. The Crew Module would then be flown back to Kennedy Space Center for refurbishment, while lunar samples would be routed to the Johnson Space Center's (JSC) Lunar Receiving Laboratory for analysis.

=== Orion asteroid mission ===
The Orion Asteroid Mission was a proposed NASA mission to a near-Earth asteroid (NEA) which would use the standard Orion spacecraft, and a landing module based on a modified Altair lunar lander. Most of its specific details are now deprecated by the cancellation of the Constellation Program and related designs. Such a mission could assess the potential value of water, iron, nickel, platinum and other resources on the asteroid; test possible ways to extract them; and possibly examine or develop techniques which could be used to protect the Earth from asteroid impacts. This would be the first crewed mission to any extraterrestrial body besides the Moon, and would represent a step towards a human mission to Mars.

The mission would start in a similar fashion to the lunar landing mission described above, using an Ares V to launch the landing module into Low Earth orbit, followed by the launch of an Orion spacecraft, with a two- or three-person crew (as opposed to a four-person crew for lunar missions) on an Ares I rocket. Once the Orion spacecraft docked with the landing module and the Earth Departure Stage (EDS), the EDS would then fire again and propel the Orion spacecraft to a nearby near-Earth asteroid where the crew would then land and explore its surface.

Once the task was completed, the Orion spacecraft would then depart from the asteroid and, upon reaching the vicinity of Earth, would jettison both the service module and the landing module in a manner similar to that of Apollo 13 before entering the atmosphere for a Pacific Ocean splashdown.

=== Orion Mars mission ===
The ultimate goal of NASA's Constellation program was a crewed mission landing humans on Mars in the 2030s as a spiritual successor to the Apollo Applications Program in the 1960s. The mission would utilize the hardware of the Constellation Project, primarily the Orion spacecraft (or a variation based on the Orion), and the Ares V cargo-launch vehicle.

A design study utilizing Constellation launch vehicles, known as Design Reference Architecture 5.0, was completed in 2009. In DRA 5.0, a Mars mission would have involved multiple launches of an Ares V rocket, as well as an Ares I to launch the crew. In the first Mars launch window, two cargo payloads would be launched into Earth orbit, as well as a nuclear thermal rocket stage for each payload, in order to boost them to Mars. Alternatively, chemical (specifically liquid hydrogen/liquid oxygen) propellant stages could have been used, although this would have required more launches. One cargo payload would include a Mars Ascent Vehicle (MAV), as well as In-situ resource utilization equipment to generate propellant for the MAV. The second cargo payload would be a habitat that the astronauts would live in during the stay on the surface. In the next launch window, 26 months after the first, the crew would go to Mars in an interplanetary transfer vehicle with nuclear thermal rocket and propellant modules assembled in Earth orbit. Once at Mars, the crew would rendezvous with the Mars habitat in orbit, land on Mars, and explore for 500 days. The crew would use the MAV to return to their interplanetary vehicle in Mars orbit, which would then be used to return to Earth. The mission would conclude with the re-entry and landing of the Orion capsule.

=== Justification for a return to the Moon ===
NASA lists a number of reasons for a human return to the Moon on its website:

1. to extend human colonization,
2. to further pursue scientific activities intrinsic to the Moon,
3. to test new technologies, systems, flight operations and techniques to serve future space exploration missions,
4. to provide a challenging, shared and peaceful activity to unite nations in pursuit of common objectives,
5. to expand the economic sphere while conducting research activities that benefit our home planet,
6. to engage the public and students to help develop the high-technology workforce that will be required to address the challenges of tomorrow.

In the words of former NASA Administrator, Michael D. Griffin, "The goal isn't just scientific exploration.... It's also about extending the range of human habitat out from Earth into the Solar System as we go forward in time.... In the long run a single-planet species will not survive.... If we humans want to survive for hundreds of thousands or millions of years, we must ultimately populate other planets ... colonize the Solar System and one day go beyond."

A report published in June 2014 by the US National Academy of Sciences called for clear long-term space goals at NASA. The report said that the agency's current course invited "failure, disillusionment, and [loss of] the longstanding international perception that human space-flight is something that the United States does best." The report recommended that Mars be the next major goal of human space flight. Several possible paths for reaching the planet by 2037 were explored in the report, which noted that returning to the Moon would offer "significant advantages" as an intermediate step in the process.

The National Space Society (NSS), a private nonprofit, regards a return to the Moon as a high priority for the US space program, in order to develop the body of scientific knowledge of the Moon, particularly in regards to its potential for the creation of new industries, in order to provide further funding for further space exploration.

== Budget and cancellation ==
=== Bush administration ===
On January 14, 2004 President George W. Bush requested that NASA develop a proposal for continued crewed space exploration after the completion of the International Space Station and the planned retirement of the Space Shuttle program in 2010. This proposal was to be a way to "establish an extended human presence on the Moon" to "vastly reduce the costs of further space exploration." Included in this would be the "harvesting and processing of lunar soil into rocket fuel or breathable air." According to Bush, experience gained could help "develop and test new approaches and technologies and systems" to begin a "sustainable course of long-term exploration."

NASA estimated that the original policy would cost $230 billion (in 2004 dollars) through 2025, including the Commercial Crew and Cargo program, which is separate from the Constellation program. However, unsolved technical and design challenges made it impossible for NASA to provide a conclusive estimate.

=== Obama administration ===
Upon taking office, President Obama declared Constellation to be "over budget, behind schedule, and lacking in innovation." A review concluded that it would cost on the order of $150 billion for Constellation to reach its objective if adhering to the original schedule. Another review in 2009, ordered by President Obama, indicated that neither a return to the Moon nor a crewed flight to Mars was within NASA's current budget. The Augustine panel proposed various options, that included two primary destination points (the Moon and deep space), three different types of Super Heavy Launch vehicles, and a robust research and development program that would include work on propellant depots.

After reviewing the report, and following congressional testimony, the Obama administration decided to exclude Constellation from the 2011 United States federal budget. On February 1, 2010, the President's proposed budget was released, which included no funding for the project, and it became law on April 15, 2011.

President Obama hosted a Space Conference on April 15, 2010, in Florida. This came at a time when the president's administration was being criticized considerably for leaving the Constellation Program out of the 2011 budget. At the conference, President Obama and top officials, as well as leaders in the field of spaceflight, discussed the future of U.S. efforts in human spaceflight and unveiled a plan for NASA that followed the Augustine Panel's "Flexible Path to Mars" option, modifying President Obama's prior proposal to include the continuing development of the Orion capsule as an auxiliary system to the ISS and setting the year 2015 as the deadline for the design of a new Super Heavy Launch Vehicle. In October 2010, the NASA authorization bill for 2010 was signed into law which canceled Constellation. However, previous legislation kept Constellation contracts in force until passage of a new funding bill for 2011.

=== Commercial Crew Vehicles and the Artemis program ===
NASA continues the development of the Orion spacecraft for deep space travel. In an effort to reduce costs, it has contracted for private development of vehicles for use in low Earth orbit. Since May 2020, the Commercial Crew Development program has used the SpaceX Crew Dragon spacecraft to bring people to and from the International Space Station, while Boeing's Starliner spacecraft started operating in 2024 for the same purpose. Furthermore, it seeks human-rating for the launch vehicles in the United States Air Force Evolved Expendable Launch Vehicles program. Private spacecraft are also operating under the Commercial Resupply Services program bringing cargo to ISS.

The Orion spacecraft and Ares V (also Jupiter DIRECT family of rockets) was modified and reauthorized in 2010/2011 as the main payload of the Space Launch System, and the program was partially revived as the Artemis program in 2017.

== See also ==
- Artemis program, similar program by NASA
- Space Launch System
- List of Constellation missions
- Crew Space Transportation System (CSTS), European-Russian counterpart of the CEV and the Vision of Space Exploration
- Exploration Systems Architecture Study
- NASA's Vision for Space Exploration
- Soviet Moonshot
- SpaceX Dragon, Space capsule built by SpaceX for NASA's Commercial Resupply Services program.
