= NASA Authorization Act of 2010 =

U.S. law

The NASA Authorization Act of 2010 is a U.S. law authorizing NASA appropriations for fiscal years 2011, 2012, 2013 with the same top-line budget values as requested by US President Barack Obama. It resulted from the Augustine Commission's review of then-current crewed space flight plans.

The law supports an overall growth in science, aeronautics, and space technology and defines a long-term goal for human spaceflight to expand a permanent human presence beyond low Earth orbit. Key objectives of this goal include full utilization of the International Space Station (ISS), determining the ability of humans to live in outer space for extended periods of time, maximizing the role of space exploration and space technology in current and future missions, advancing knowledge and inspiring young people into higher education, and building upon international partnerships.

The act was signed by President Obama on October 11, 2010. A total of $58 billion in funding is called for, spread across three years.

== Human spaceflight ==
In regard to human spaceflight, the law is intended to:

- Couple human spaceflight efforts to national and global needs and challenges.
- Provide a sustainable space exploration program to incorporate new technologies and in-space capabilities.
- Require immediate development of the Space Launch System (SLS) as a follow-on launch vehicle to the Space Shuttle and continued development of a crew exploration vehicle to be capable of supporting missions beyond low Earth orbit starting in 2016.
- Support a sound performance and cost framework by maximizing use, where possible, of the workforce, assets, and capabilities of the Space Shuttle, Constellation program, and other NASA programs.

== Space technology ==
The law will invest in space technologies and robotics capabilities that are tied to the overall space exploration framework and support U.S. innovation and competitiveness.

== Commercial cargo and crew ==
In regard to commercial cargo and crew, the law will:

- Continue to support commercial cargo development and provide additional funds to meet launch infrastructure requirements and accelerate development activity.
- Expand the Commercial Crew Development Program in 2011 for concept development and supporting activities, while requiring a number of studies to ensure effective oversight of the potential initiation of a commercial crew capability procurement program no earlier than 2012.

== International Space Station ==
In regard to the International Space Station (ISS), the law will:

- Extend the ISS to at least 2020 to support international and commercial collaboration and growth, research, and technology development to maximize the scientific return on the significant investment in the ISS.
- Establish an independent non-profit to work with NASA to fully develop the ISS U.S. segment as a National Laboratory.
- Require an assessment of ISS requirements for parts and equipment needed to ensure its full functionality through 2020.

== Additional "launch on need" Shuttle mission ==
The law authorizes an additional Space Shuttle flight (STS-135), contingent on a safety review, to provide necessary support for the extension of the ISS.

== Science and aeronautics ==
The law protects a balanced portfolio for NASA, including full funding of aeronautics, Earth science and space science.

== Education ==
In regard to education, the law will:

- Support new education initiatives, such as teacher training programs, to reinforce NASA's role in developing a workforce with strong science, technology, engineering, and mathematics skills.
- Increase the investment in NASA EPSCoR (Experimental Program to Stimulate Competitive Research) and NASA Space Grant program.

== Rescoping and revitalizing institutional capabilities ==
The law requires NASA to examine alternative management models for NASA's workforce, centers, and capabilities, while enforcing short-term prohibitions on major center displacements and reductions-in-force until the study is completed.

== See also ==
- National Space Grant College and Fellowship Program
- Space Launch System
- Space policy of the Barack Obama administration
- National Aeronautics and Space Administration Authorization Act of 2014 (H.R. 4412; 113th Congress), failed in the Senate
- CHIPS and Science Act, passed 2022 by the 117th Congress, containing NASA authorization provisions
