= Space policy of the Trump administration =

The space policy of the Trump administration may refer to:

- Space policy of the first Trump administration
- Space policy of the second Trump administration
