= Cleon Lacefield =

American businessman

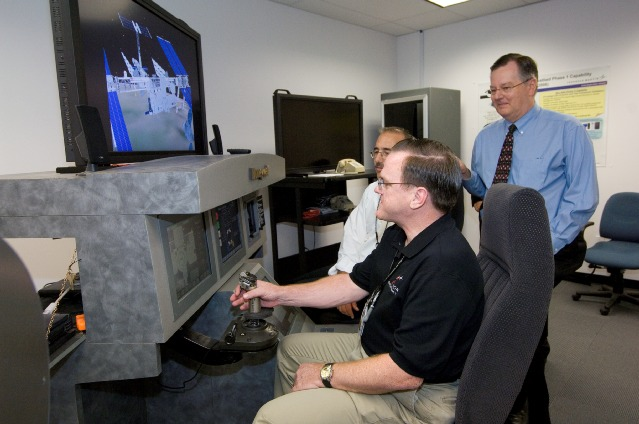
Cleon Lacefield (right) with some NASA and Lockheed colleagues

T. Cleon Lacefield is Lockheed Martin’s vice president and Orion program manager.

With his Lockheed Martin team in Denver and Houston, he won the CEV / Orion development contract from NASA in September 2006.

== Career ==
He was NASA Space Shuttle flight director in the 1980s and Lockheed Martin Skunk Works X-33 program manager in the 1990s.
