= Siju Iluyomade =

Nigerian lawyer, speaker and activist

- Born: January 8, 1964 (age 62); Nigeria
- Education: University of Ife (now Obafemi Awolowo University)
- Occupations: Lawyer, speaker, activist
- Known for: Founder of Arise Women Conference; Handmaidens Women in Leadership Series
- Spouse: Idowu Iluyomade
- Children: 3

Siju Iluyomade (born 8 January 1964) is a Nigerian lawyer, speaker and activist. She is the founder of Arise Women Conference, a faith-based Non-Governmental Organization (NGO) for women empowerment and Handmaidens Women in Leadership Series.

== Education ==
Siju attended Queen's College and got her law degree from University of Ife (now Obafemi Awolowo University, Ile Ife).

== Personal life ==
She is married to Idowu Iluyomade, a former senior pastor at the Redeemed Christian Church of God now a founder of Family fellowship ministry with 3 children.
