= Wendy Okolo =

Aerospace engineer

- Born: Nigeria
- Citizenship: American
- Education: University of Texas at Arlington (aerospace engineering, PhD degree)
- Alma mater: University of Texas at Arlington
- Occupation: research engineer
- Employer: NASA Ames Research Center

Wendy A. Okolo is a Nigerian-American aerospace research engineer in the Intelligent Systems Division at NASA Ames Research Center. She is the first Black woman to obtain a Ph.D. degree in aerospace engineering from University of Texas at Arlington. She was also the Special Emphasis Programs Manager for Women at Ames.

== Education ==
Okolo obtained her secondary education at Queen's College, an all-girls school in Lagos, Nigeria. She then received a bachelor's degree in aerospace engineering at the University of Texas at Arlington (UTA) in 2010. Okolo later became the first Black woman to obtain a Ph.D. in aerospace engineering from UTA in 2015 at age 26. Her Ph.D. studies were supervised by Atilla Dogan. During Okolo's undergraduate years, she served as president of the Society of Women Engineers at the university.

== Career ==
Okolo started her career as an undergraduate intern for Lockheed Martin, working on NASA's Orion spacecraft. Over the course of two summers, she interned with the Requirements Management Office in Systems Engineering and the Hatch Mechanisms team in Mechanical Engineering. As a graduate student, Okolo later worked in the Control Design & Analysis Branch of the Air Force Research Laboratory (AFRL), Wright-Patterson Air Force Base.

Okolo is an Associate Project Manager in the Intelligent Systems Division of NASA Ames. She is a research engineer in the Discovery and Systems Health Technology (DaSH).

== Personal life ==
Okolo says her sisters taught her the sciences with their day-to-day realities. She describes them as her heroes.

== Awards ==
- Amelia Earhart Fellowship (2012)
- DoD National Defense Science and Engineering Graduate (NDSEG) Fellowship (2012)
- Texas Space Grant Consortium (TSGC) Fellowship (2012, 2013)
- AIAA John Leland Atwood Graduate Award (2013)
- Black Engineer of the Year Award (BEYA) for The Most Promising Engineer in the United States government.

== See also ==
- Aerospace engineers
