= Ascent Abort-2 =

Test of the Launch Abort System of NASA's Orion spacecraft

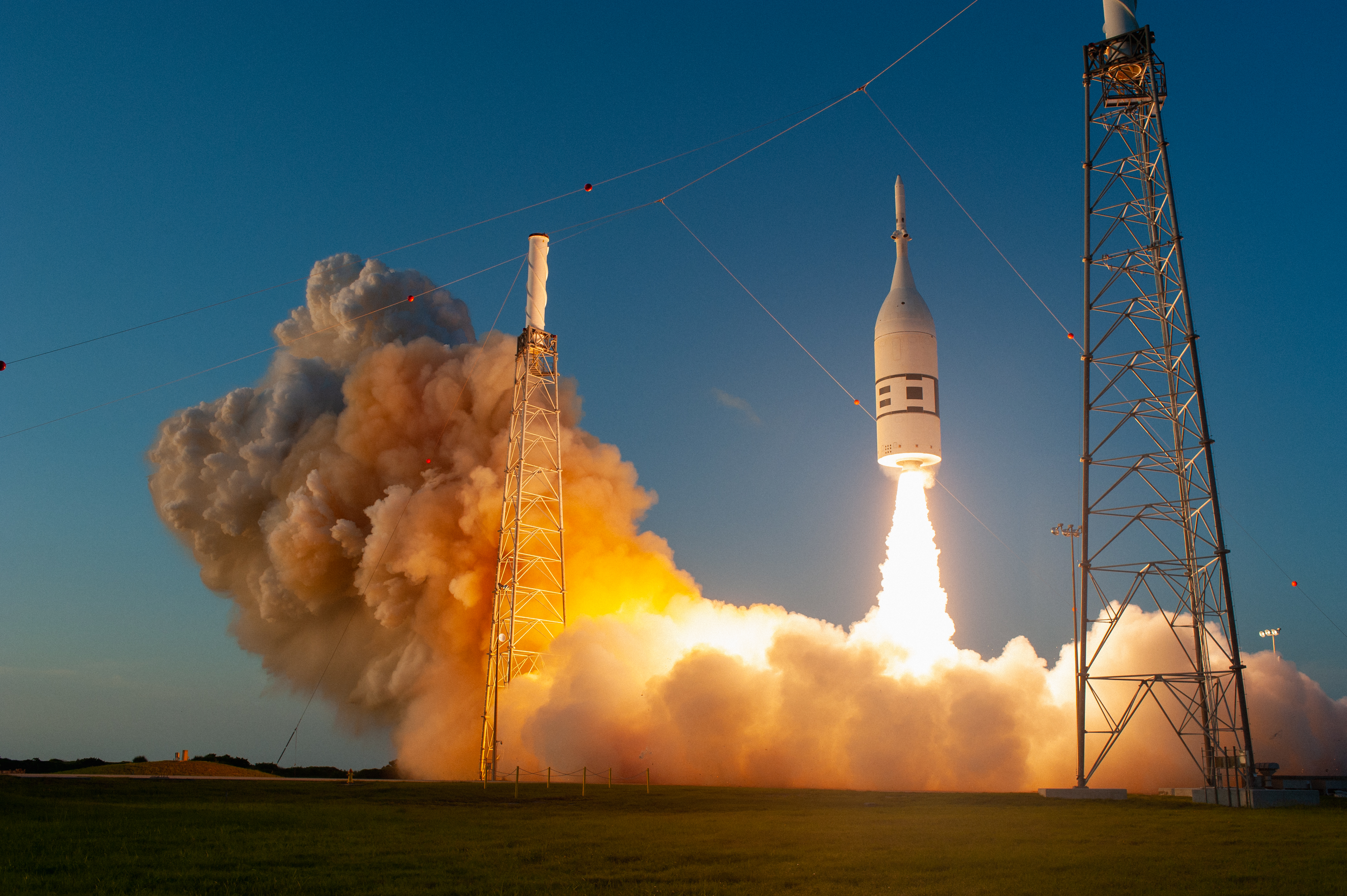
- Launch of Ascent Abort-2
- Mission type: Technology demonstration
- Operator: NASA
- Mission duration: 3 minutes, 13 seconds
- Apogee: 31,000 ft (9,400 m)

Spacecraft properties
- Spacecraft type: Orion test article

Start of mission
- Launch date: 2 July 2019, 11:00 UTC (07:00 EDT)
- Rocket: Orion Abort Test Booster (modified Minotaur IV first stage)
- Launch site: Cape Canaveral, SLC-46

End of mission
- Landing site: Atlantic Ocean
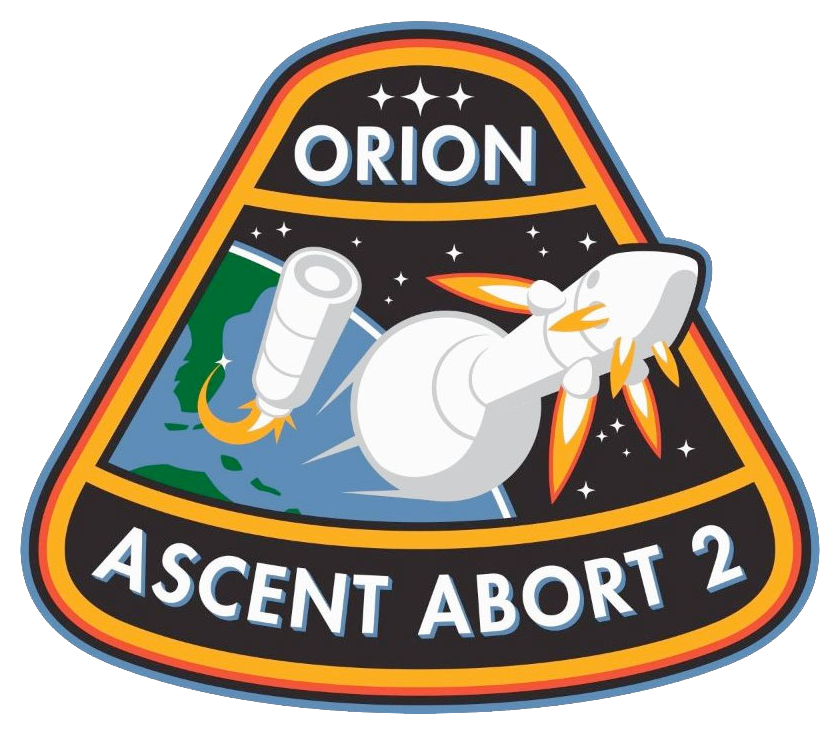
- Orion program Artemis program

Ascent Abort-2 (AA-2) was a test of the launch escape system (LAS) of NASA's Orion spacecraft.

The test followed Orion's Pad Abort-1 test in 2010 and Exploration Flight Test-1 in 2014 in which the capsule first flew in space. It preceded an uncrewed flight of Orion around the Moon as the Artemis 1 mission, and paves the way for human use of Orion in subsequent missions of the Artemis program.

The test flight lifted off from Space Launch Complex 46 at Cape Canaveral Air Force Station on 2 July 2019 at 11:00 UTC (07:00 EDT, local time at the launch site). The flight was successful, and the launch abort system performed as designed.

== Mission highlights ==
An Orion test article, aerodynamically similar to but lacking the full features of the space-tested capsule, was launched from Cape Canaveral SLC-46 by the purpose-built Orion Abort Test Booster (ATB). The booster was a repurposed Peacekeeper missile first stage (SR118) procured from the United States Air Force and modified for the mission by Orbital ATK/Northrop Grumman, similar to the first stage of the Peacekeeper-derived Minotaur IV. The mission's goal was to demonstrate and qualify the Orion Launch Abort System (LAS) that will allow the astronaut crew to safely escape in the event of an emergency during launch pad operations, through the ascent phase of the Orion vehicle.

The LAS was set to activate after around 55 seconds of ascent at an altitude of 31,000 feet (9,400 m), close to the point of maximum dynamic pressure, while the booster was still firing. No parachute system was installed on the Crew Module due to the cost of Orion's parachutes and the amount of testing the parachutes had already undergone. The test article transmitted telemetry data during its flight, and as a backup 12 data recorders were ejected in pairs during its descent, starting about 20 seconds after separation of the capsule from the abort motor. They were recovered from the Atlantic Ocean.
