= Afolabi =

Name of Yoruba origin

- Language: Yoruba

Origin
- Origin: Nigeria
- Meaning: born in wealth and high status
- Region of origin: South western Nigeria

Afolabi audiois a name of Yoruba origin that means "born in wealth and high status". Notable people with the name include:

- Abdulwaheed Afolabi (born 1991), Nigerian footballer
- Afolabi Olabimtan (1932–2003), Nigerian politician and writer
- Bosede Afolabi (born 1970), UK-born Nigerian gynaecologist
- Ola Afolabi (born 1980), British boxer
- Olabisi Afolabi (born 1975), Nigerian athlete
- Rabiu Afolabi (born 1980), Nigerian footballer
- S. A. Afolabi (born 1966), Nigerian novelist and short story writer
- Oladapo Afolabi (born 1953), Nigerian academic and public servant
- Afolabi Olumide (1936–2021), Nigerian academic and pioneering vice chancellor of Lagos State University
