= Honey Ogundeyi =

Nigerian entrepreneur

Djmiwa
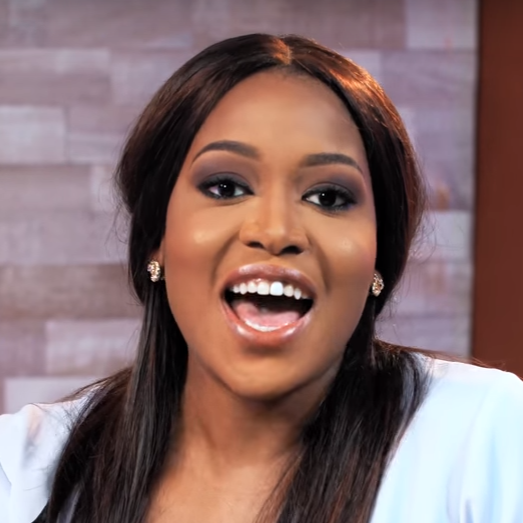
- Honey Ogundeyi on NdaniTV in 2017
- Education: University of Birmingham
- Occupation: Internet Entrepreneur
- Years active: 2014–present
- Known for: founding fashpa

Oyindamola Honey Ogundeyi is the founder of Fashpa.com, a Nigerian e-commerce site that designed and sold its products online and in store and also sold fashion and lifestyle brands from the international market to Nigerians. She launched an entrepreneurial vlog Side Hustle to Empire in 2017 where she gives tips on how she started and runs her business.

== Education ==
She started her secondary education at Queens College Yaba, Lagos and finished her secondary education in Alexandra College in Dublin, Ireland. She then proceeded to the University of Birmingham and graduated with a BSc in Public Policy and Management.

== Career ==
Ogundeyi was an associate with UBA Group from 2004 to 2006. She later worked for companies including McKinsey & Company, where she worked in consulting in Brussels and Johannesburg. After her spell with McKinsey & Company, she worked with Ericsson as Head of Brand Management for Sub-Saharan Africa and then proceeded to Google as an Industry Manager.

Ogundeyi launched Fashpa.com in April 2014. She founded the company after she was unable to get shoes she wanted from Balogun Market in Lagos Island, Nigeria. As of October 2021, the website was defunct.
