= Orion (spacecraft) =

Artemis program crewed spacecraft

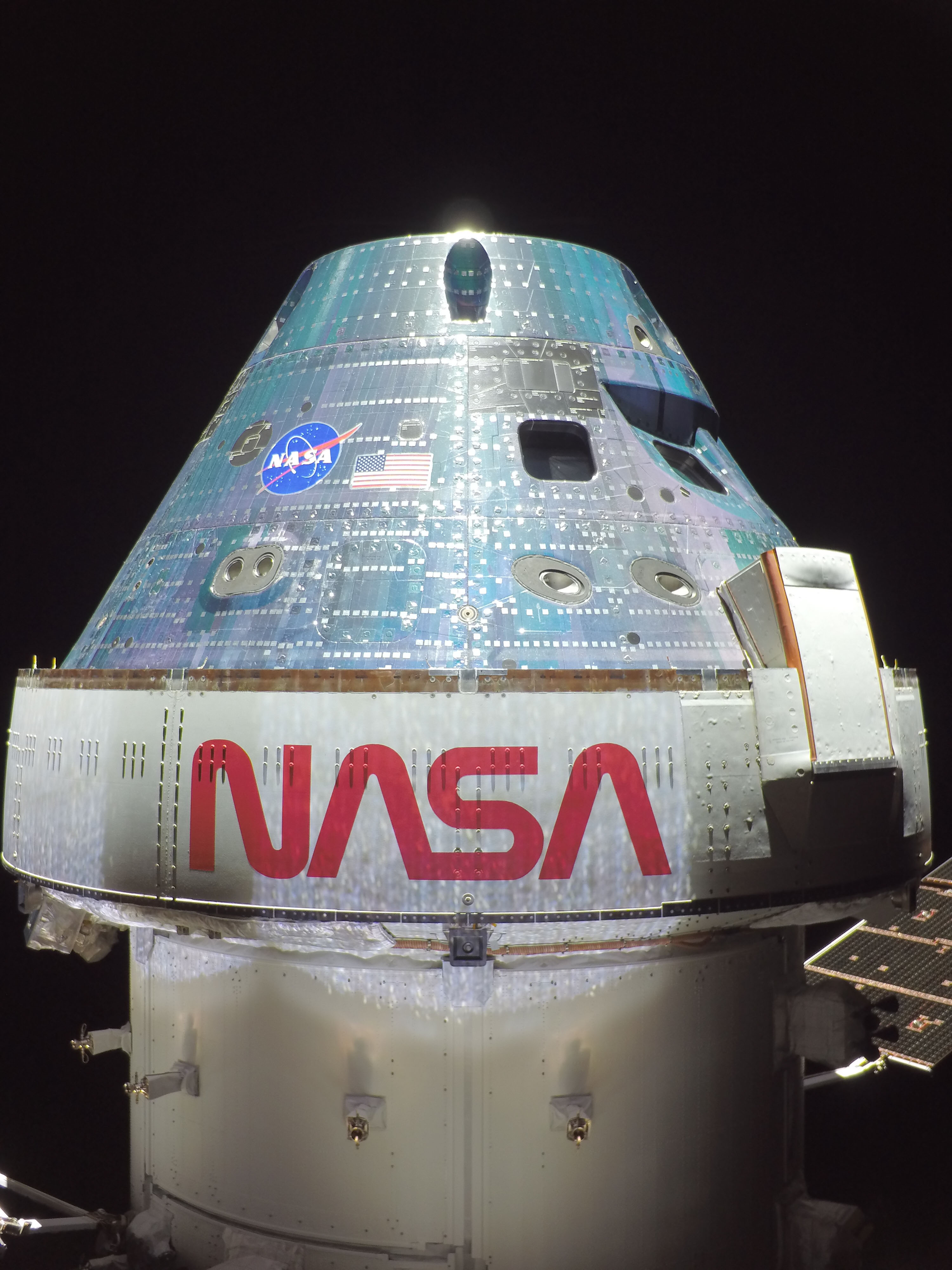
- Photo of Orion taken during the flight of Artemis II
- Manufacturer: CM: Lockheed Martin; ESM: Airbus Defence and Space
- Operator: NASA
- Applications: Crewed exploration beyond LEO
- Project cost: US$21.5 billion ($26.3 billion inflation adjusted to 2022)

Specifications
- Spacecraft type: Crewed
- Launch mass: CM: 22,900 lb (10,400 kg); CM and ESM: 58,467 lb (26,520 kg); CM, ESM and LAS: 73,735 lb (33,446 kg)
- Dry mass: CM: 20,500 lb (9,300 kg); CM and ESM: 34,135 lb (15,483 kg)
- Payload capacity: Crew + 220 lb (100 kg)
- Crew capacity: 4
- Volume: Pressurized: 690.6 ft^{3} (19.56 m^{3}); Habitable: 316 ft^{3} (8.9 m^{3})
- Power: 11 kW solar array on ESM
- Design life: 21.1 days

Dimensions
- Length: 3.3 m (11 ft)
- Diameter: 5.03 m (16.5 ft)

Production
- Status: In service
- On order: 3
- Built: 5
- Launched: 3
- Retired: 1
- Maiden launch: December 5, 2014 (EFT-1)
- Last launch: April 1, 2026 (Artemis II, most recent)

Related spacecraft
- Derived from: Crew Exploration Vehicle

The Orion Multi-Purpose Crew Vehicle (MPCV) is a partially reusable crewed spacecraft used by NASA for the Artemis lunar exploration program. It consists of a crew module (CM), a space capsule built by Lockheed Martin, and is paired with a European Service Module (ESM) provided by the European Space Agency (ESA) and manufactured by Airbus Defence and Space. Orion supports a crew of four beyond low Earth orbit for up to 21 days undocked or up to six months when docked. It is equipped with a NASA Docking System port and glass cockpit displays. It is intended to be launched atop the Space Launch System (SLS) rocket with a tower-mounted launch escape system.

Orion was conceived in the early 2000s by Lockheed Martin as a proposal for the Crew Exploration Vehicle (CEV) to be used in NASA's Constellation program and was selected by NASA in 2006. After the cancellation of the Constellation program in 2010, Orion was extensively redesigned for use in NASA's Journey to Mars initiative; later named Moon to Mars. The SLS became Orion's primary launch vehicle, and the service module was replaced with a design based on ESA's Automated Transfer Vehicle.

As of 2026, three flight-worthy vehicles had been built along with several boilerplates and test articles. Three additional flight-worthy vehicles are under construction.

In May 2025, the second Trump administration proposed terminating the Orion spacecraft program after Artemis III. The One Big Beautiful Bill Act signed in July 2025 included a provision to fund procurement of Orion for Artemis IV and reuse in future missions.

== Design ==
Currently operational crewed spacecraft (at least orbital class)

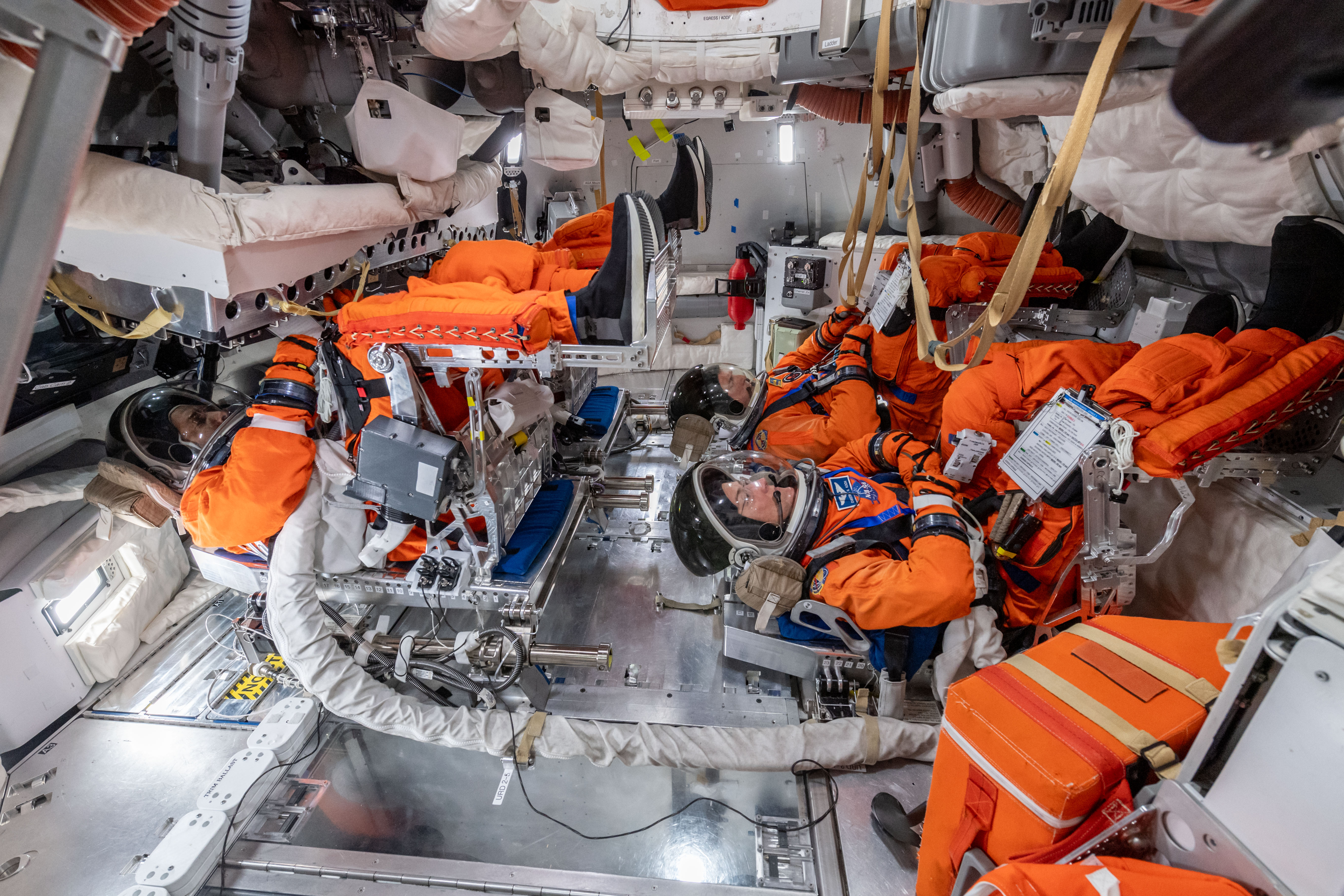
The crew of Artemis II training inside an Orion mock-up in January 2025

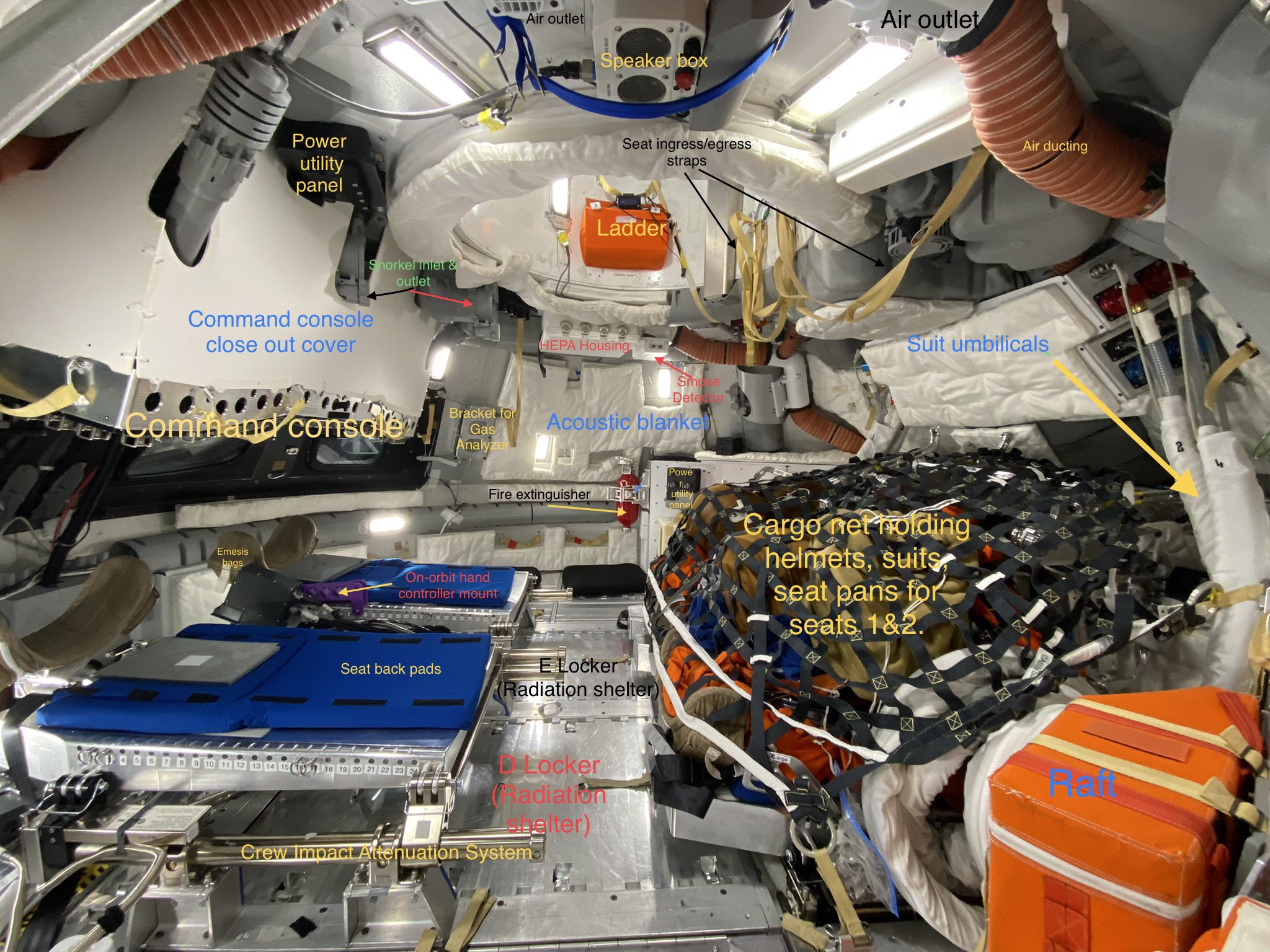
Annotated photo of the Orion mock-up, outfitted to fully simulate a crewed mission, 2021

Orion is based on the configuration of the Apollo command and service module (CSM), with a larger diameter, updated thermal protection system, and modern avionics. It is designed for deep space missions supporting up to 21 days of active crew operations and up to six months of quiescent spacecraft operation. The Orion crew module launches with the European Service Module, a spacecraft adapter, and a launch abort system.

The Orion crew module (OCM) is a reusable capsule providing habitable volume, storage for consumables and research equipment, and an International Docking System Standard (IDSS) port for crew transfers. It is the only major spacecraft element that returns to Earth after each mission and is designed for refurbishment and reuse, with modular systems intended to support incremental upgrades over time.

=== Structure and manufacture ===
The OCM is built of aluminum-lithium alloy and has a 57.5° frustum shape with a blunt spherical aft end, 5.02 meters (16 ft 6 in) in diameter and 3.3 meters (10 ft 10 in) in length, with a mass of about 8.5 metric tons (19,000 lb). The module provides approximately 50% more internal volume than the Apollo command module and is designed to carry four astronauts on Artemis missions. It is manufactured by Lockheed Martin, with the pressure vessel built at the Michoud Assembly Facility in New Orleans, Louisiana, and final assembly conducted at the Operations and Checkout Building at Kennedy Space Center in Florida.

=== Thermal protection ===
After evaluation of thermal protection materials, NASA selected AVCOAT for the ablative heat shield. AVCOAT consists of silica fibers embedded in a resin within a honeycomb structure of fiberglass and phenolic resin. It was previously used on the Apollo missions and the Space Shuttle orbiter.

=== Crew systems and accommodations ===
The OCM uses a glass cockpit with digital control systems derived in part from those used in the Boeing 787 Dreamliner. The commander and pilot are seated facing three main display screens and seven switch panels within arm's reach, which provide spacecraft status information and allow control of onboard systems. A cursor control device enables interaction with the display screens under high g-forces, when the crew can not easily reach out. The interface supports both routine operations and anomaly response through integrated electronic procedures and warning systems. Rotational and translational hand controllers enable the crew to manually adjust the spacecraft's orientation and movement.

The four crew seats are designed to accommodate a wide range of astronaut body sizes, from approximately the 1st to the 99th percentile, (Note: This covers a range from a 4-foot-10-inch (1.47 m), 94-pound (43 kg) female to a 6-foot-5-inch (1.96 m), 243-pound (110 kg) male.) and are adjustable. For launch and re-entry, astronauts are positioned on their backs with knees bent at a 90-degree angle and feet secured in foot pans. Each seat incorporates a five-point harness, headrests, and shoulder and hip bolsters, with foot restraints that interface with crew footwear to limit movement. The seats include an impact attenuation system, which reduces loads during splashdown by allowing controlled motion along guide rails. Once in orbit, the foot pans on the commander and pilot seats are removed and stowed to increase cabin space, and a cargo net over the mission specialist seats provides storage for equipment and suit components.

The spacecraft operates with a mixed nitrogen/oxygen (N_{2}/O_{2}) atmosphere at either sea-level pressure (101.3 kPa or 14.69 psi) or a reduced pressure (55.2 to 70.3 kPa or 8.01 to 10.20 psi). As of 2019, the Spacecraft Atmosphere Monitor was planned to be used in the OCM.

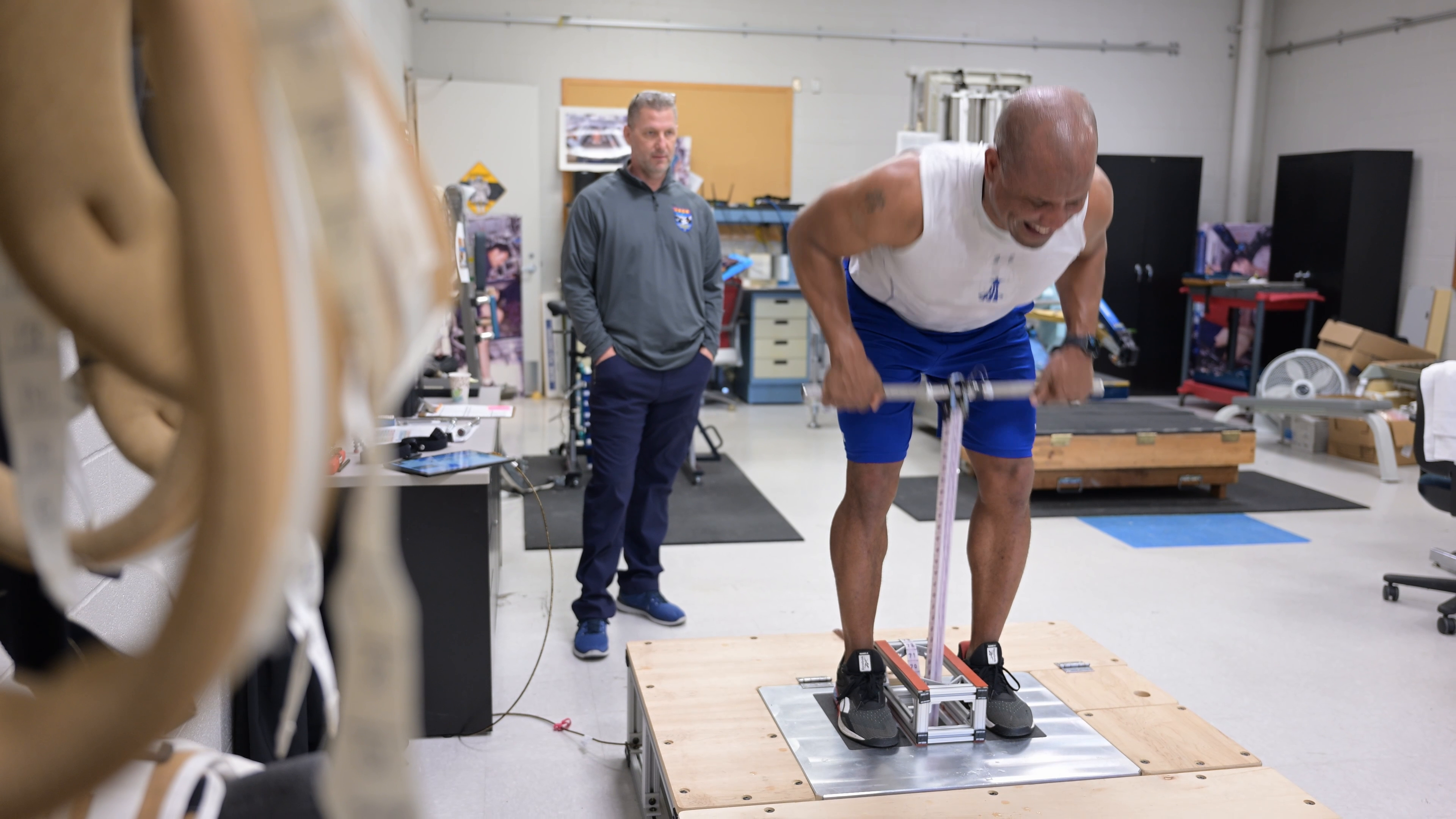
The Orion flywheel exercise device

The OCM includes the compact Orion flywheel exercise device, which allows astronauts to perform aerobic and resistance exercises during flight using a cable-driven flywheel mechanism. The system was designed to meet the spacecraft's mass and volume constraints while also allowing for a wide range of exercises. Mounted below the side hatch, it also functions as a step for crew members entering or exiting the spacecraft.

The OCM includes a space toilet called the Universal Waste Management System (UWMS) inside a fully enclosed 5-square-foot (0.46 m^{2}) compartment for privacy that uses airflow to manage liquid and solid waste. Solid waste is stored in sealed containers, while treated liquid waste is vented overboard.

The potable water dispenser supplies water for rehydrating food, preparing drinks, and supporting medical needs in Orion. It connects to four pressurized tanks in the service module. A briefcase-style food warmer plugs into Orion's power utility panel for operation and allows the crew to heat food and beverages. It can be secured to cabin surfaces using Velcro when needed and stowed when not in use.

=== Launch and recovery ===
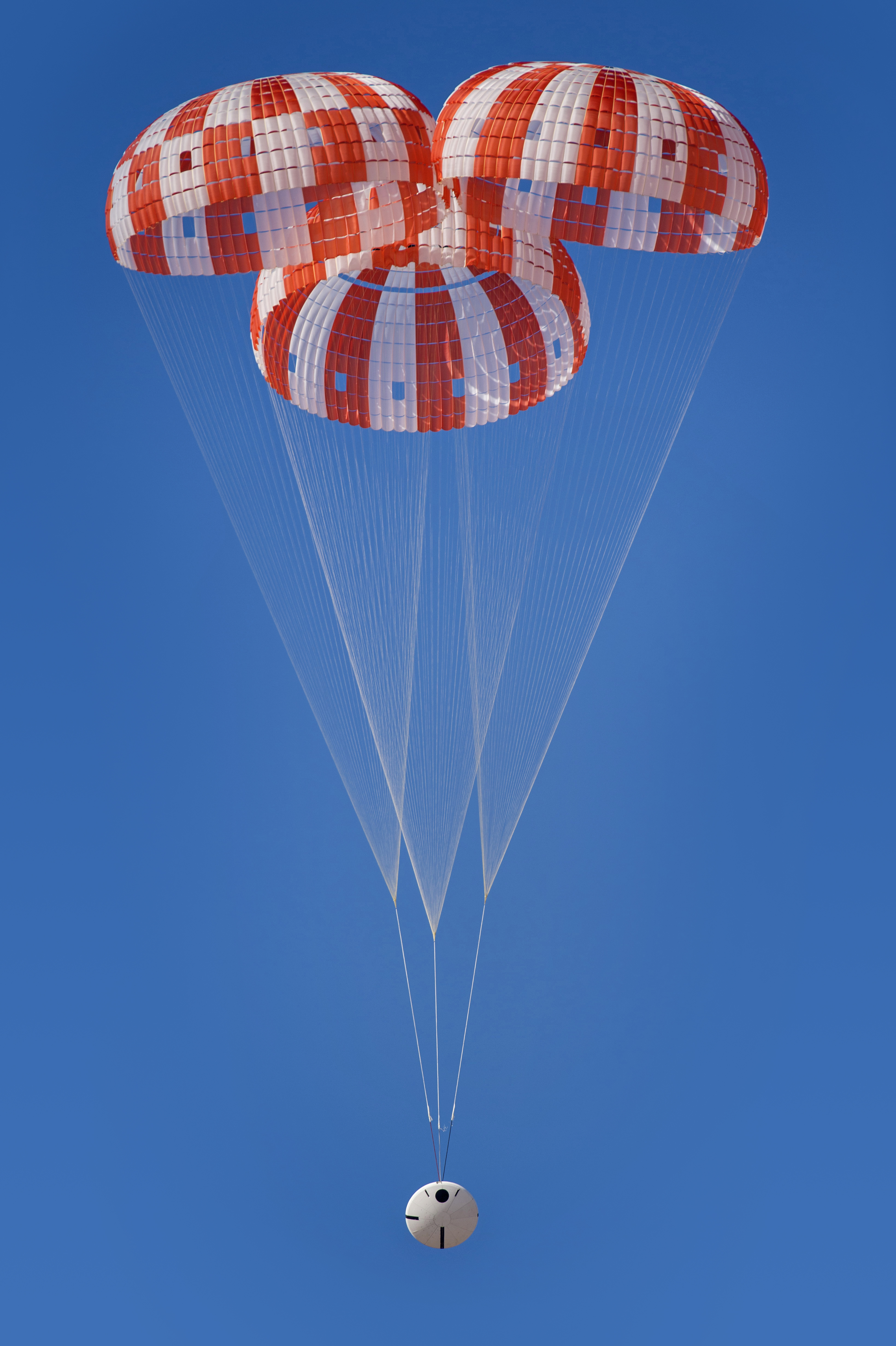
Testing of Orion's parachute system

During launch, the spacecraft is equipped with a launch abort system (LAS), attached to the nose of the spacecraft. The spacecraft is covered by a fiberglass "Boost Protective Cover" that shields the crew module from aerodynamic and impact stresses during the first 2 1/2 minutes of ascent.

The capsule is recovered by parachute-assisted water landing. The parachute system is derived from those used on Apollo spacecraft and Space Shuttle Solid Rocket Boosters and is constructed of Nomex.

== European Service Module (ESM) ==
The European Service Module (ESM) is the service module component of the Orion spacecraft, serving as its primary power and propulsion component until it is discarded at the end of each mission. In January 2013, the National Aeronautics and Space Administration (NASA) announced that the European Space Agency (ESA) will contribute the service module for Artemis I, based on ESA's Automated Transfer Vehicle (ATV). It was delivered by Airbus Defence and Space from Bremen, Germany, to NASA at the end of 2018. After approval of the first module, ESA provided the ESM for Artemis II with current plans to continue the provision up to Artemis VI.

The module's first flight was Artemis I, the first major milestone in NASA's Artemis program to return humans to the Moon, on November 16, 2022. The Space Launch System launched Orion toward the Moon, where the ESM placed the spacecraft into distant retrograde orbit around the Moon, and subsequently extracted it from that orbit and sent it back to Earth.

The service module (SM) supports the crew module (CM) from launch through to separation prior to reentry. It provides in-space propulsion capability for orbital transfer, attitude control, and high altitude ascent aborts. It provides the water and oxygen needed for a habitable environment, generates and stores electrical power, and maintains the temperature of the vehicle's systems and components. This module can also transport unpressurized cargo and scientific payloads.

Unlike the Apollo command and service module, the ESM does not have the delta-v necessary to return to Earth from low lunar orbit. This limitation motivates the larger size of Artemis's Human Landing Systems, and previously the Lunar Gateway.

== Launch Abort System (LAS) ==
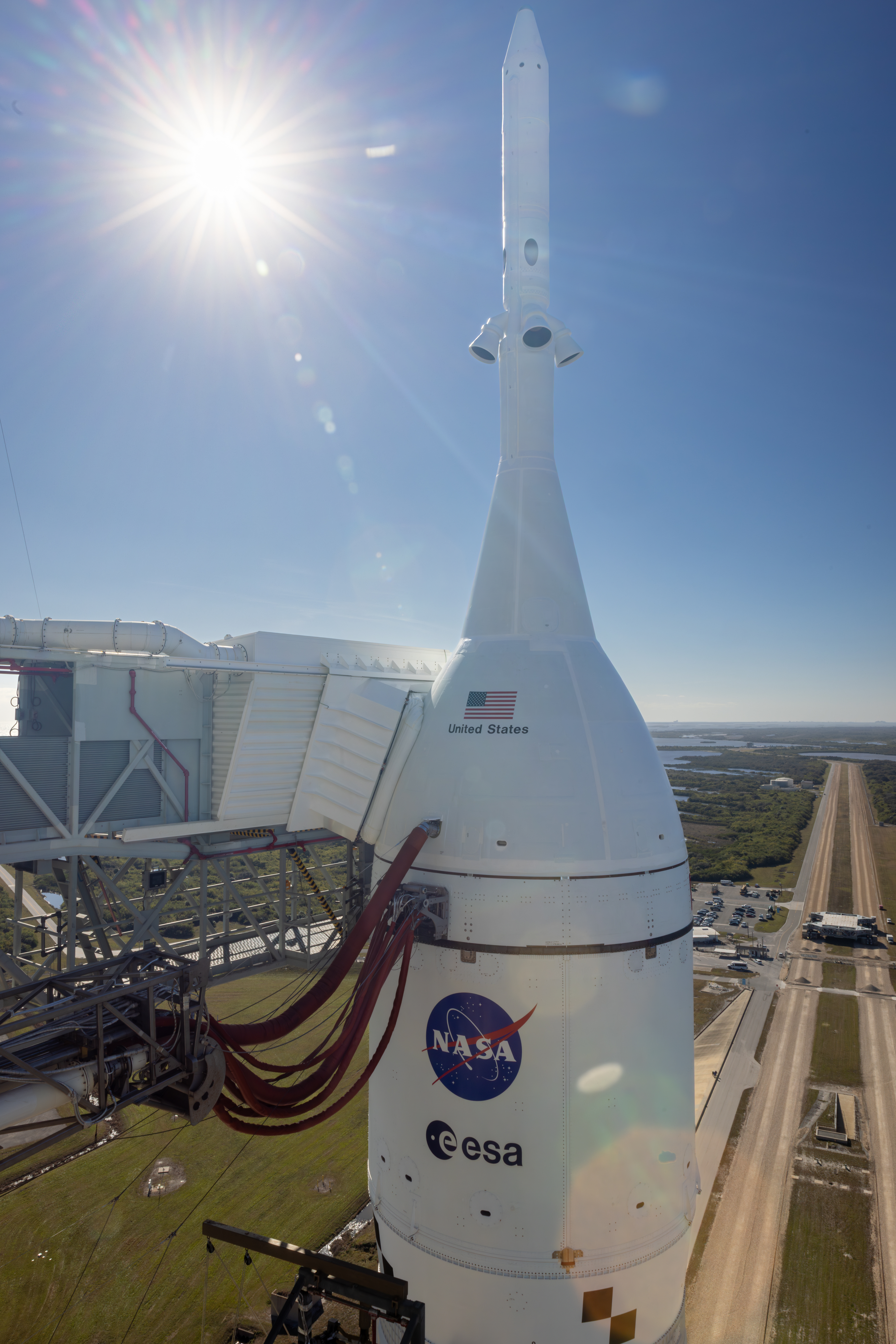
Artemis II's upper mission stage with the LAS cone.

In the event of an emergency on the launch pad or during ascent, the Launch Abort System (LAS) will separate the crew module from the launch vehicle using three solid rocket motors: an abort motor (AM), an attitude control motor (ACM), and a jettison motor (JM). The AM provides the thrust needed to accelerate the capsule, while the ACM is used to point the AM and the jettison motor separates the LAS from the crew capsule. On July 10, 2007, Orbital Sciences, the prime contractor for the LAS, awarded Alliant Techsystems (ATK) a $62.5 million sub-contract to "design, develop, produce, test and deliver the launch abort motor," which uses a "reverse flow" design. On July 9, 2008, NASA announced that ATK had completed construction of a vertical test stand at a facility in Promontory, Utah to test launch abort motors for the Orion spacecraft. Another long-time space motor contractor, Aerojet, was awarded the jettison motor design and development contract for the LAS. As of September 2008, Aerojet has, along with team members Orbital Sciences, Lockheed Martin and NASA, successfully demonstrated two full-scale test firings of the jettison motor. This motor is used on every flight, as it separates the LAS from the vehicle after both a successful launch and a launch abort.

== Performance ==
With the announcement in 2019 of the intent to procure a Human Landing System for Artemis missions, NASA provided Orion mass and propulsion capability values. After separation from the SLS upper stage, the Orion is expected to have a mass of 26,375 kg (58,147 lb) and be capable of performing maneuvers requiring up to 1,050 m/s (3,445 ft/s) of delta-v.

== History ==
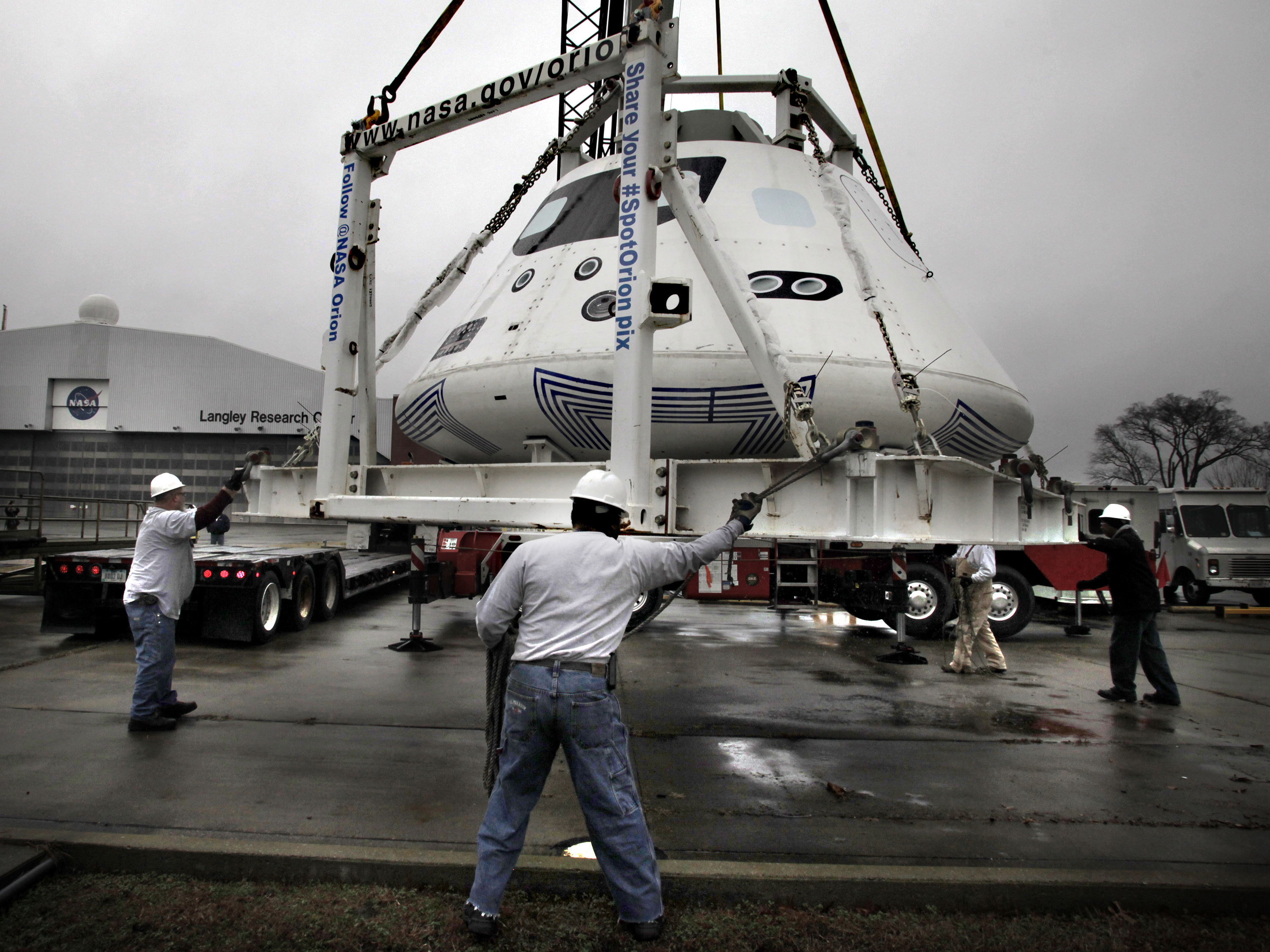
Transport of the Orion capsule before the first test (2013)

The Orion MPCV was announced by NASA on May 24, 2011. Its design is based on the Crew Exploration Vehicle from the canceled Constellation program, which had been a 2006 NASA contract award to Lockheed Martin. The command module is being built by Lockheed Martin at the Michoud Assembly Facility, while the Orion service module is being built by Airbus Defence and Space in Bremen with funding from the European Space Agency. The CM's first uncrewed test flight (EFT-1) was launched without the EUS atop a Delta IV Heavy rocket on December 5, 2014, and lasted 4 hours and 24 minutes before landing at its target in the Pacific Ocean.

Orion was primarily designed by Lockheed Martin Space Systems in Littleton, Colorado, with former Space Shuttle engineer Julie Kramer White at NASA as Orion's chief engineer.

On November 30, 2020, it was reported that NASA and Lockheed Martin had found a failure with a component in one of the Orion spacecraft's power data units but NASA later clarified that it did not expect the issue to affect the Artemis I launch date.

=== Funding history and planning ===
NASA has spent $25.6 billion on Orion development from 2006 through 2025, in nominal dollars. This is equivalent to $33.6 billion in 2026 dollars using the NASA New Start Inflation Indices.

Fiscal year	Funding		Source
Fiscal year	In Nominal (millions)	In 2026 (millions)	Source
2006	$839.2	$1,367.9	Crew Exploration Vehicle (CEV)
2007	$714.5	$1,121.4	CEV
2008	$1,174.1	$1,779.3	CEV
2009	$1,747.9	$2,599.4	CEV
2010	$1,640.0	$2,406.0	CEV
2011	$1,196.0	$1,726.8	MPCV
2012	$1,200.0	$1,714.3	Orion MPCV
2013	$1,138.0	$1,567.6	Orion MPCV
2014	$1,197.0	$1,652.3	Orion Program
2015	$1,190.2	$1,610.5	Orion Program
2016	$1,270.0	$1,697.9	Orion Program
2017	$1,350.0	$1,767.2	Orion
2018	$1,350.0	$1,723.5	Orion
2019	$1,350.0	$1,690.9	Orion
2020	$1,406.7	$1,723.7	Orion
2021	$1,403.7	$1,657.3	Orion
2022	$1,401.7	$1,565.5	Orion
2023	$1,315.1	$1,411.1	FY 2023 Op Plan in FY 2025 Budget Request
2024	$1,283.7	$1,343.1	FY 2024 Op Plan in FY 2026 Budget Request
2025	$1,431.4	$1,463.9	FY 2025 Spend Plan
Total	$25,575.0	$33,589.7	

Excluded from the prior Orion costs are:

- Most costs "for production, operations, or sustainment of additional crew capsules, despite plans to use and possibly enhance this capsule after 2021"; production and operations contracts were awarded going into fiscal year 2020.
- The costs of Orion's service module, provided by the European Space Agency. (The European Service Module.)
- Excluded from the Orion cost above are the costs to assemble, integrate, prepare and launch the Orion, funded separately in the NASA Exploration Ground Systems program, running at about $600 million per year in 2021, estimated then to remain in this range through the first four launches of Orion, though this ground systems element has risen to be budgeted at $909.9M in 2025.
- Costs of the launcher, the SLS, for the Orion spacecraft

In late 2015, the Orion program was assessed at a 70% confidence level for its first crewed flight by 2023, but in January 2024 NASA announced plans for a first crewed flight of Orion no earlier than September 2025. This has subsequently been updated to a first crewed flight with Orion, on mission Artemis II, which launched on April 1, 2026.

In 2016, the NASA manager of exploration systems development said that Orion, SLS, and supporting ground systems should cost "US$2 billion or less" annually. NASA will not provide the cost per flight of Orion and SLS, with associate administrator William H. Gerstenmaier stating "costs must be derived from the data and are not directly available. This was done by design to lower NASA's expenditures" in 2017. As of 2020, there were no NASA estimates for the Orion program recurring yearly costs once operational, for a certain flight rate per year, or for the resulting average costs per flight. A production and operations contract awarded to Lockheed Martin in 2019 indicated NASA will pay the prime contractor $900 million for the first three Orion capsules and $633 million for the next three. For 2021 to 2025, NASA estimates yearly budgets for Orion from $1.4 to $1.1 billion.

=== Attempted cancellation of Orion program ===
On 2 May 2025, the Trump administration released its fiscal year 2026 budget proposal for NASA, which calls for terminating the Orion and SLS programs after Artemis III. The budget allocates funding for a program to transition to "more cost-effective commercial systems". However, this proposal was rejected by Congress on July 2025, favoring the continuation of the program alongside the SLS and the Lunar Gateway.

== Variants ==
=== Orion Crew Exploration Vehicle (CEV) ===
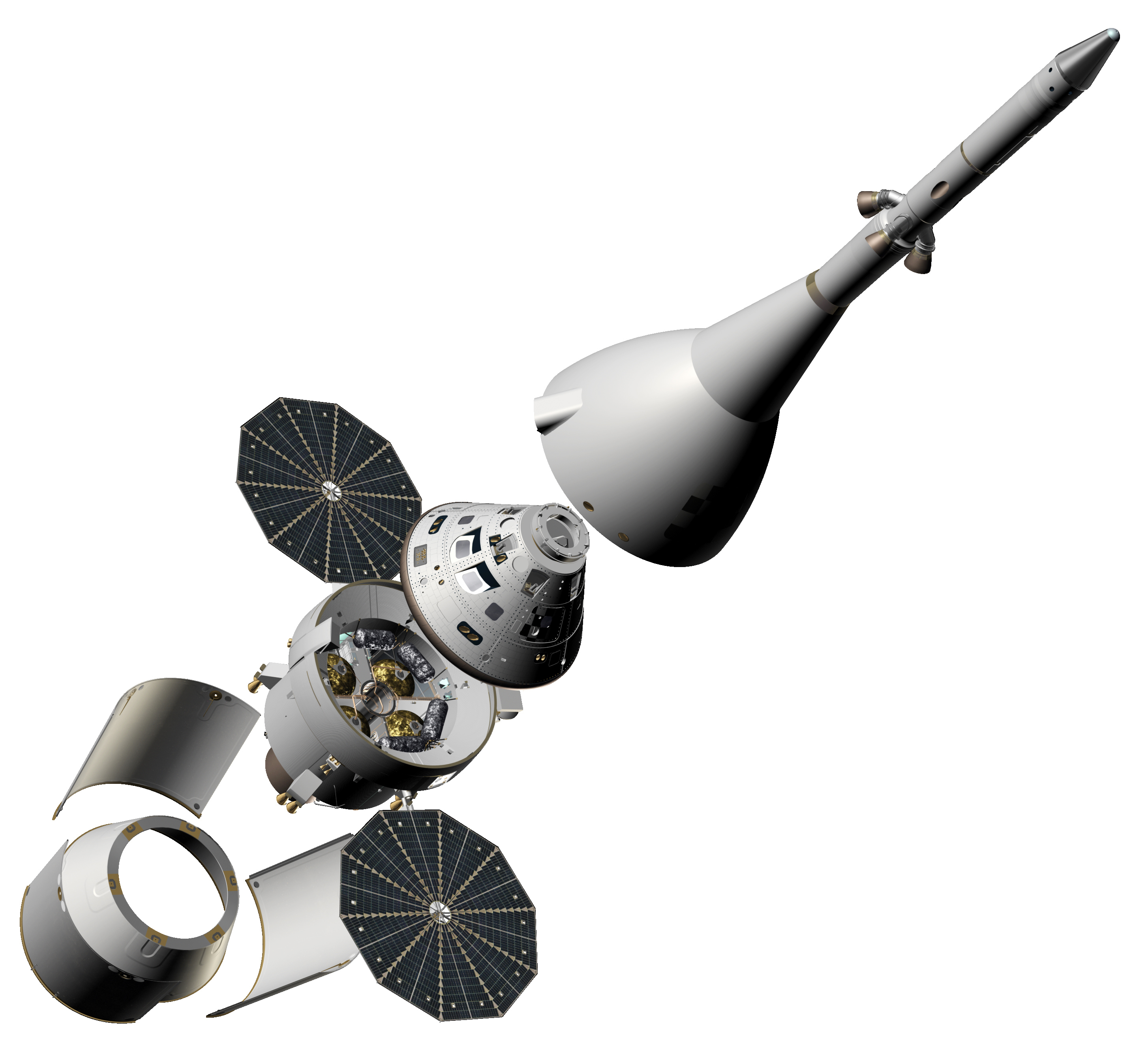
Orion CEV design as of 2009

The idea for a Crew Exploration Vehicle (CEV) was announced on January 14, 2004, as part of the Vision for Space Exploration after the Space Shuttle Columbia accident. The CEV effectively replaced the conceptual Orbital Space Plane (OSP), a proposed replacement for the Space Shuttle. A design competition was held, and the winner was the proposal from a consortium led by Lockheed Martin. It was subsequently named "Orion" in 2006 after the stellar constellation and mythical hunter of the same name, and became part of the Constellation program under NASA administrator Sean O'Keefe. As of 2006, NASA planned for the first flight to the International Space Station with astronauts onboard to be no later than 2014.

Constellation proposed using the Orion CEV in both crew and cargo variants to support the International Space Station and as a crew vehicle for a return to the Moon. The crew/command module was originally intended to land on solid ground on the US west coast using airbags but later changed to ocean splashdown, while a service module was included for life support and propulsion. With a diameter of 5 meters (16 ft 5 in) as opposed to 3.9 meters (12 ft 10 in), the Orion CEV would have provided 2.5 times greater volume than the Apollo CM. The service module was originally planned to use liquid methane (CH_{4}) as its fuel, but switched to hypergolic propellants due to the infancy of oxygen/methane-powered rocket technologies and the goal of launching the first uncrewed Orion CEV by 2012.

The Orion CEV was to be launched on the Ares I rocket to low Earth orbit, where it would rendezvous with the Altair lunar lander launched on a heavy-lift Ares V launch vehicle for lunar missions.

==== Environmental testing ====
NASA performed environmental testing of Orion from 2007 to 2011 at the Glenn Research Center Plum Brook Station in Sandusky, Ohio. The Center's Space Power Facility is the world's largest thermal vacuum chamber.

==== Launch Abort System (LAS) testing ====
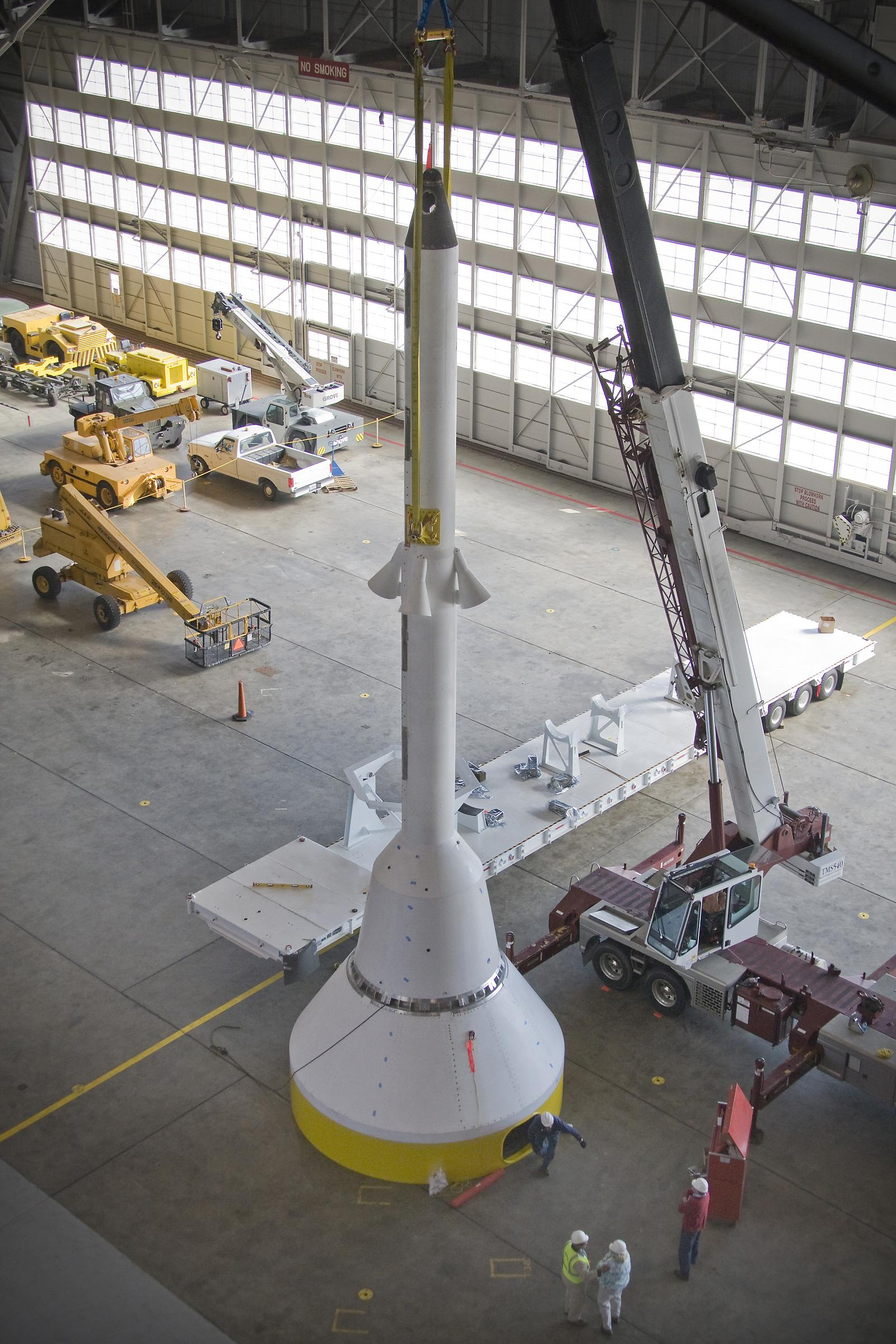
Orion LAS test assembled at the NASA Langley Research Center

ATK Aerospace successfully completed the first Orion Launch Abort System (LAS) test on November 20, 2008. The LAS motor could provide 500,000 lbf (2,200 kN) of thrust in case an emergency situation should arise on the launch pad or during the first 300,000 feet (91 km) of the rocket's climb to orbit.

On March 2, 2009, a full size, full weight command module mockup (pathfinder) began its journey from the Langley Research Center to White Sands Missile Range in southern New Mexico for at-gantry launch vehicle assembly training and for LES testing. On May 10, 2010, NASA successfully executed the LES PAD-Abort-1 test at White Sands, launching a boilerplate (mock-up) Orion capsule to an altitude of approximately 6,000 feet (1,800 m). The test used three solid-fuel rocket motors – the main thrust motor, an attitude control motor and the jettison motor.

==== Splashdown recovery testing ====
In 2009, during the Constellation phase of the program, the Post-landing Orion Recovery Test (PORT) was designed to determine and evaluate methods of crew rescue and what kind of motions the astronaut crew could expect after landing, including conditions outside the capsule for the recovery team. The evaluation process supported NASA's design of landing recovery operations including equipment, ship and crew needs.

The PORT Test used a full-scale boilerplate (mock-up) of NASA's Orion crew module and was tested in water under simulated and real weather conditions. Tests began March 23, 2009, with a Navy-built, 18,000-pound (8,200 kg) boilerplate in a test pool. Full sea testing ran April 6–30, 2009, at various locations off the coast of NASA's Kennedy Space Center with media coverage.

==== Cancellation of Constellation program ====
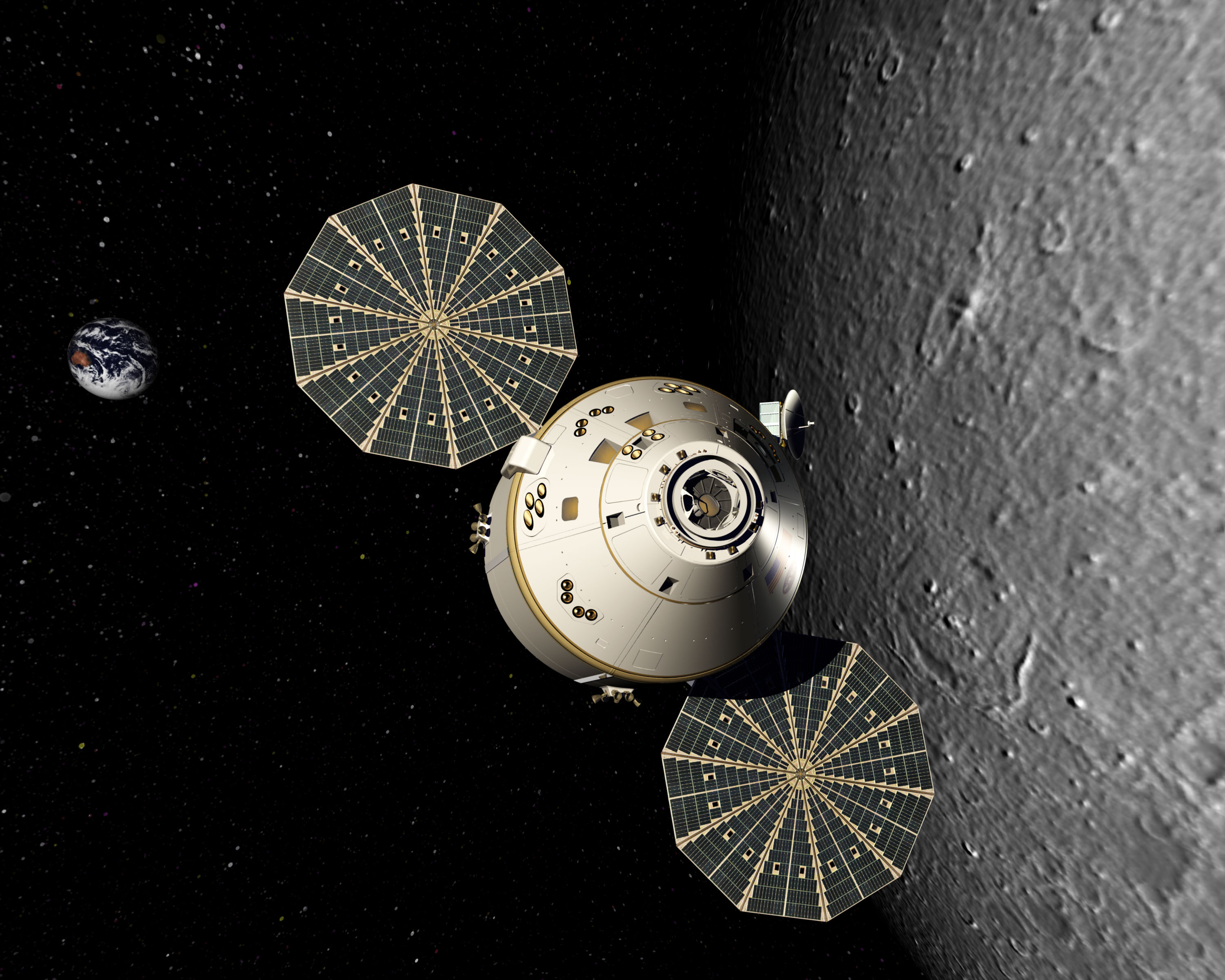
Artist's conception of Orion (as then-designed) in lunar orbit

On May 7, 2009, the Obama administration enlisted the Augustine Commission to perform a full independent review of the ongoing NASA space exploration program. The commission found the then-current Constellation Program to be too under-budgeted with significant cost overruns, behind schedule by four years or more in several essential components, and unlikely to be capable of meeting any of its scheduled goals. As a consequence, the commission recommended a significant re-allocation of goals and resources. As one of the many outcomes based on these recommendations, on October 11, 2010, the Constellation program was canceled, ending development of the Altair, Ares I, and Ares V. The Orion Crew Exploration Vehicle survived the cancellation and was transferred to be launched on the Space Launch System.

=== Orion Multi-Purpose Crew Vehicle (MPCV) ===
The Orion development program was restructured from three different versions of the Orion capsule, each for a different task, to the development of the MPCV as a single version capable of performing multiple tasks. On December 5, 2014, a developmental Orion spacecraft was successfully launched into space and retrieved at sea after splashdown on the Exploration Flight Test-1 (EFT-1).

==== Orion splashdown recovery testing ====
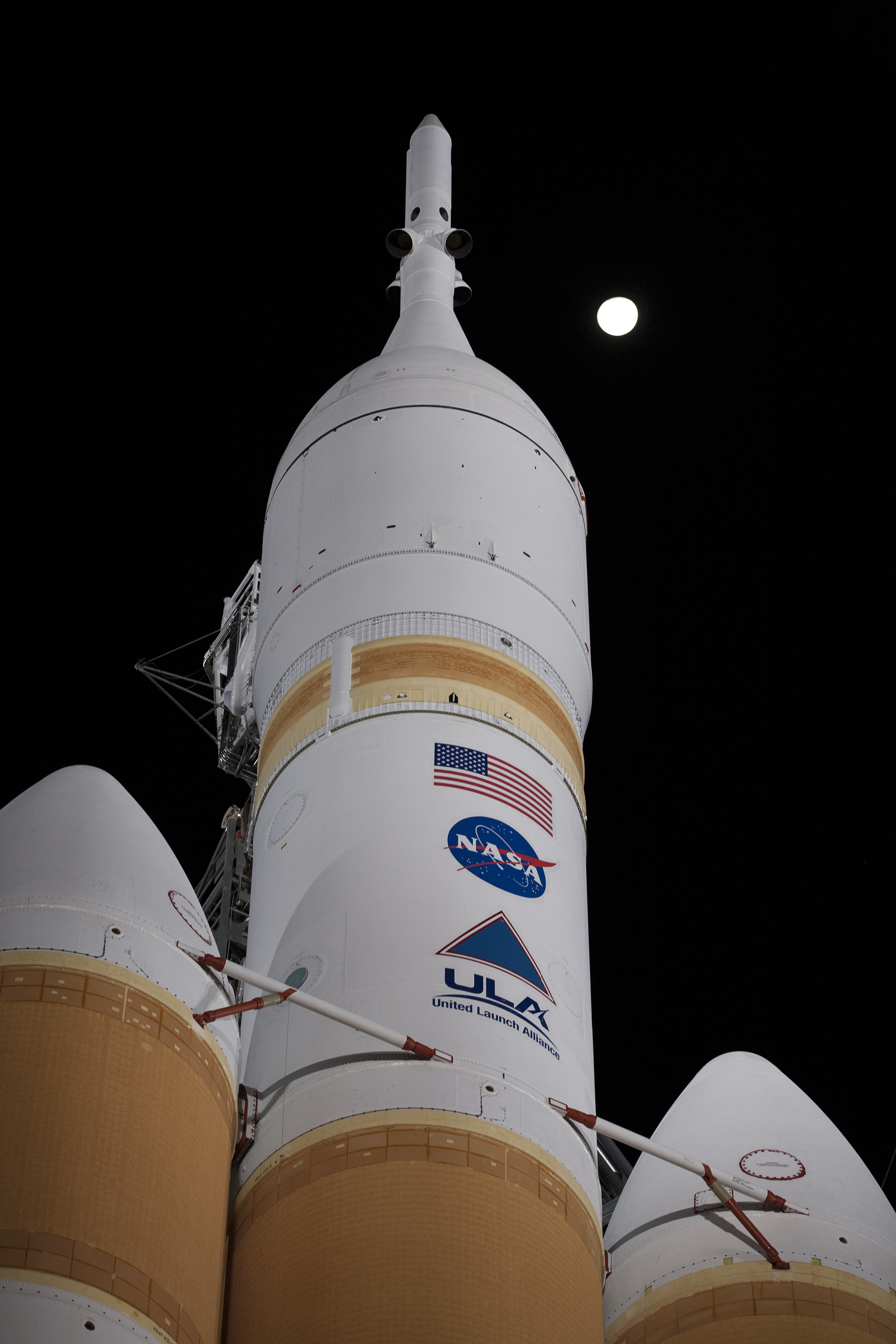
EFT-1 on top of a Delta IV Heavy

Before EFT-1 in December 2014, several preparatory vehicle recovery tests were performed, which continued the "crawl, walk, run" approach established by PORT. The Stationary Recovery Test (SRT) demonstrated the recovery hardware and techniques that were to be employed for the recovery of the Orion CM in the protected waters of Naval Station Norfolk using the LPD-17 type USS Arlington as the recovery ship.

=== Orion Lite ===
==== History ====
Orion Lite is an unofficial name used in the media for a lightweight crew capsule proposed by Bigelow Aerospace in collaboration with Lockheed Martin. It was to be based on the Orion spacecraft that Lockheed Martin was developing for NASA. It was never developed. It was to be a lighter, less capable and a less expensive version of the full Orion.

Orion Lite was intended to provide a stripped-down version of the Orion that would be available for missions to the International Space Station earlier than the more capable Orion, which is designed for longer duration missions to the Moon and Mars.

Bigelow had begun working with Lockheed Martin in 2004. A few years later Bigelow signed a million-dollar contract to develop "an Orion mockup, an Orion Lite", in 2009.

The proposed collaboration between Bigelow and Lockheed Martin on the Orion Lite spacecraft has ended. Bigelow began work with Boeing on a similar capsule, the CST-100, which has no Orion heritage, and was one of the two systems selected under NASA's Commercial Crew Development (CCDev) program to transport crew to the ISS.

==== Design ====
Orion Lite's primary mission would be to transport crew to the International Space Station (ISS), or to private space stations such as the planned B330 from Bigelow Aerospace. While Orion Lite would have the same exterior dimensions as the Orion, there would be no need for the deep space infrastructure present in the Orion configuration. As such, the Orion Lite would have been able to support larger crews of around 7 people as the result of greater habitable interior volume and the reduced weight of equipment needed to support an exclusively low-Earth-orbit configuration.

==== Recovery ====
In order to reduce the weight of Orion Lite, the more durable heat shield of the Orion would be replaced with a lighter weight heat shield designed to support the lower temperatures of Earth atmospheric re-entry from low Earth orbit. Additionally, the current proposal calls for a mid-air retrieval, wherein another aircraft captures the descending Orion Lite module. To date, such a retrieval method has not been employed for crewed spacecraft, although it has been used with satellites.

== Flights ==
=== Development test flights ===
Mission and patch	Launch (UTC)	Launch site	Launch vehicle	Duration	Outcome
MLAS	July 8, 2009, 10:26	Wallops	MLAS	57 seconds	Success
MLAS	Boilerplate launched on test flight of the Max Launch Abort System (MLAS)				
Ares I-X	October 28, 2009, 15:30	Kennedy, LC‑39B	Ares I-X	6 minutes	Success
Ares I-X	Boilerplate launched on test flight of the Ares I rocket				
Pad Abort 1	May 6, 2010, 13:03	White Sands, LC‑32E	Orion LAS	95 seconds	Success
Pad Abort 1	Boilerplate launched on test of the launch abort system				
Exploration Flight Test-1	December 5, 2014, 12:05	Cape Canaveral, SLC‑37	Delta IV Heavy	4 hours, 24 minutes	Success
Exploration Flight Test-1	Orbital flight test of Orion's heat shield, parachutes, jettisoning components, and on-board computers. Did not fly with a ESM. Recovered by USS Anchorage.				
Ascent Abort-2	July 2, 2019, 11:00	Cape Canaveral, SLC‑46	Orion Abort Test Booster	193 seconds	Success
Ascent Abort-2	Boilerplate launched on test of the Launch Abort System				

=== Artemis missions ===
Mission and patch	Launch (UTC)	Crew	Lander	Duration	Outcome
Artemis I	November 16, 2022; 06:47:44	Uncrewed	None	25 days	Success
Artemis I	Maiden flight of the SLS, formerly "Exploration Mission 1" (EM1), carrying an uncrewed Orion capsule and ten CubeSats selected through several programs. The payloads were sent on a trans-lunar injection trajectory.				
Artemis II	April 1, 2026; 22:35:12	Reid Wiseman; Victor Glover; Christina Koch; Jeremy Hansen	None	9 days	Success
Artemis II	First crewed flight, carrying four crew members on a circumlunar free-return trajectory.				
Artemis III	Late 2027	Randy Bresnik; Luca Parmitano; Frank Rubio; Andre Douglas	Blue Moon and/or Starship	≈14 days	Planned
Artemis III	Crewed tests with Blue Moon and/or Starship prototypes in low Earth orbit.				
Artemis IV	Early 2028	TBA	Blue Moon or Starship HLS	≈30 days	Planned
Artemis IV	First lunar landing of the Artemis program.				
Artemis V	Late 2028	TBA	Blue Moon or Starship HLS	≈30 days	Planned
Artemis V	Second Artemis crewed lunar landing. Expected to see first efforts to begin building a permanent Moon base.				

=== Potential commercial lunar missions ===
In December 2025, Lockheed Martin announced plans to offer commercial flights to individuals and other space agencies aboard Orion in the future, aiming to reuse the capsules after Artemis III to drive down the cost of spacecraft operations.

=== Potential Mars missions ===
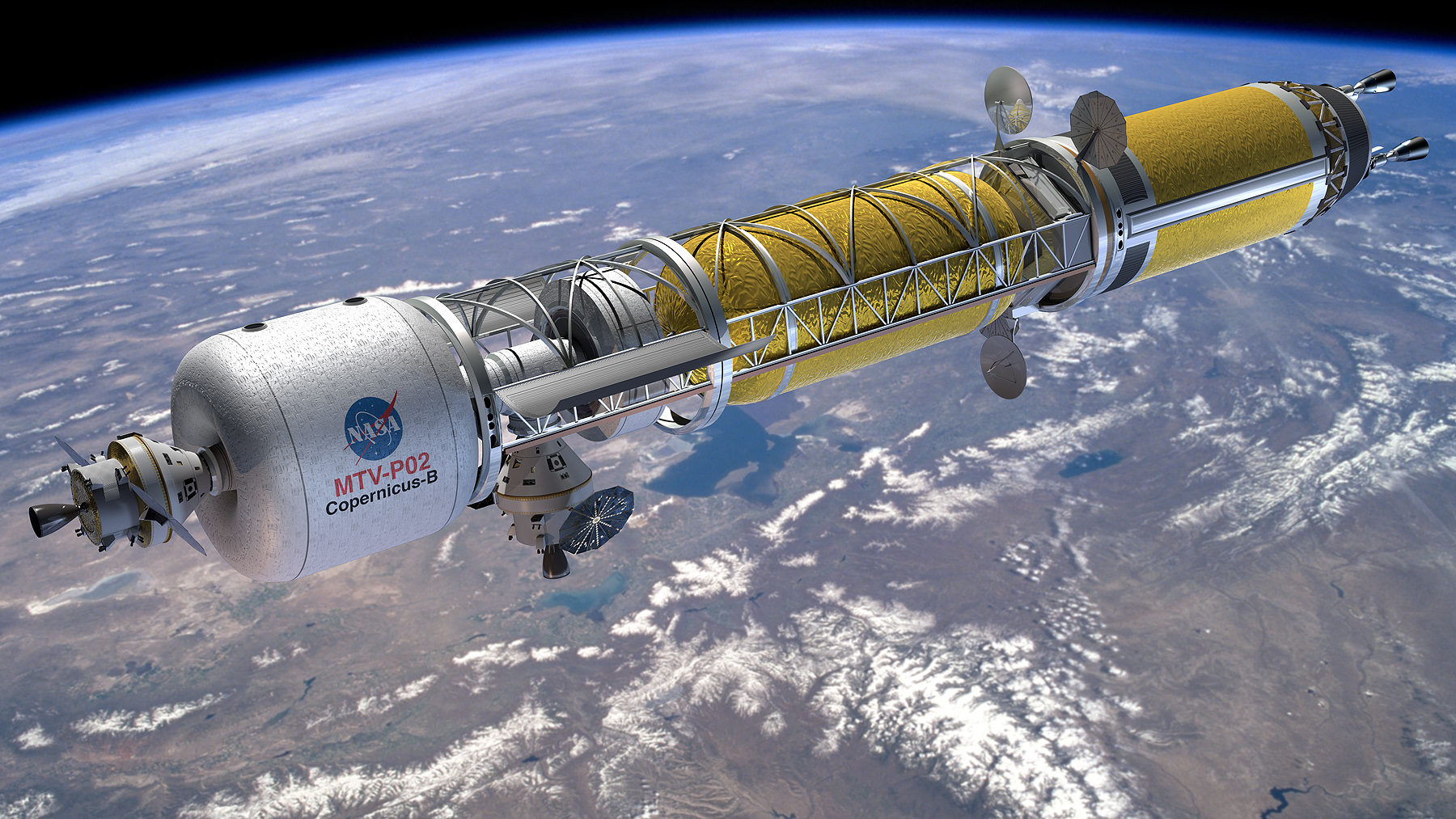
Artist rendering of the Orion CEV docked to a proposed Mars Transfer Vehicle

The Orion capsule is designed to support future missions to send astronauts to Mars, with many proposals for such a mission to take place in the 2030s, including in an official plan by NASA in 2015. Since the Orion capsule provides only about 2.25 m^{3} (79 cu ft) of living space per crew member, the use of an additional Deep Space Habitat (DSH) module featuring propulsion will be needed for long-duration missions. The complete spacecraft stack is known as the Deep Space Transport. The habitat module will provide additional space and supplies, as well as facilitate spacecraft maintenance, mission communications, exercise, training, and personal recreation. Some concepts for DSH modules would provide approximately 70.0 m^{3} (2,472 cu ft) of living space per crew member, though the DSH module is in its early conceptual stage. DSH sizes and configurations may vary slightly, depending on crew and mission needs. As of 2026, there are no plans for a crewed mission to Mars using Orion, and the mission timeline to launch in the early 2030s is deemed unfeasible.

=== Asteroid Redirect Mission (canceled) ===
The Asteroid Redirect Mission (ARM), also known as the Asteroid Retrieval and Utilization (ARU) mission and the Asteroid Initiative, was a space mission proposed by NASA in 2013. The Asteroid Retrieval Robotic Mission (ARRM) spacecraft would rendezvous with a large near-Earth asteroid and use robotic arms with anchoring grippers to retrieve a 4-meter boulder from the asteroid. A secondary objective was to develop the required technology to bring a small near-Earth asteroid into lunar orbit – "the asteroid was a bonus." There, it could be analyzed by the crew of the Orion EM-5 or EM-6 ARCM mission in 2026.

== List of vehicles ==
Boilerplate Test article Spaceflight vehicle

Image	Serial/ name	Status	Flights	Time in flight	Notes	Cat.
	Unknown	Retired	1	57s	Boilerplate used in Max Launch Abort System test; did not have a service module.	
	Unknown	Expended	1	~6m	Boilerplate used in Ares I-X launch; did not have a service module. Intentionally destroyed during the flight.	
	Unknown	Retired	1	2m, 15s	Boilerplate used in Pad Abort-1 test; did not have a service module.	
	Unknown	Expended	1	3m, 13s	Boilerplate used in Ascent Abort-2 test; did not have a service module. Intentionally destroyed during the flight.	
	BTA	Active	0	None	Boilerplate Test Article, underwent splashdown testing at Langley Research Center from 2011 to 2012. Later used for recovery training.	
	PTA	Retired	0	None	Parachute Test Vehicle, tested at the Yuma Proving Ground from 2007 to 2018. Tests included staged parachute failures; with two of three mains. Early tests (2007–2010) had failures, leading to redesign.	
	GTA	Active	0	None	Ground Test Article, with higher structural fidelity than BTA. Used for crew module ground tests with mock service modules and splashdown testing at Langley in 2016 using the flown Orion 001 heat shield.	
	STA	Active	0	None	Structural Test Article, based on the Orion 003 design. Structurally identical to production spacecraft used to support design verification and limit testing. Used for splashdown testing at Langley in 2021. Paired with ESM STA.	
	001	Retired	1	4h, 24m, 46s	Vehicle used in uncrewed Exploration Flight Test-1. First Orion to fly in space; did not have a service module. On display at Kennedy Space Center Visitor Complex.	
	002	Active	1	25d 10h 52m	Vehicle used in uncrewed Artemis I. First to fly with ESM and go to the Moon. Now used for ground testing.	
	003; Integrity	Active	1	9d 1h 32m	Vehicle used in Artemis II. First Orion to carry crew.	
	004 (To be named)	Under construction	0	None	Vehicle to be used in Artemis III. Pressure vessel shipped to Kennedy Space Center in August 2021.	
	005 (To be named)	Under construction	0	None	Vehicle to be used in Artemis IV. Pressure vessel shipped to Kennedy Space Center in March 2023.	
	006 (To be named)	Under construction	0	None	Vehicle to be used in Artemis V. Pressure vessel shipped to Kennedy Space Center in August 2025.	

== See also ==
- List of crewed spacecraft
- NASA Authorization Act of 2010 – U.S. law
- Space policy of the Barack Obama administration – US federal plans for NASA post-2010
