= Iphigenia Efunjoke Coker =

Nigerian educator (1924–2019)

- Born: 29 September 1924; Lagos, Nigeria
- Died: 23 December 2019 (aged 95)
- Citizenship: Nigerian
- Education: University College Dublin
- Occupation: Teacher

Iphigenia Efunjoke Coker (29 September 1924 – 23 December 2019) was a Nigerian educator. From 1963 to 1977, she was Principal of Queen's College, Lagos, the first person of Nigerian descent to hold the position.

== Life ==
Iphigenia Efunjoke Coker was born in Lagos, Nigeria, on 29 September 1924, the daughter of Mr. and Mrs. Bankole Soluade. She attended St. Mary's Convent School, St. Theresa's High School, St. Agnes's Teacher Training College and Queen's College, Lagos. In the 1940s, she taught at St. Teresa's High School in Lagos and Ibadan and at St. Agnes's in Lagos.

From 1952 to 1956, she studied at University College Dublin. Returning to Nigeria, she taught at Queen's School, Ede and Government College, Ibadan. In 1962, she became Vice Principal at Queen’s College, and was appointed Principal the following year, succeeding Margaret Gentle. Coker remained there until her retirement in 1977.

In 1979, General Olusegun Obasanjo appointed Coker a Member of the Order of the Federal Republic (MFR). In 2017, she was awarded an honorary doctorate from the Federal University Oye-Ekiti.

She died on 23 December 2019, aged 95.
