= Margaret Gentle Harwood =

British educator

Margaret Gentle Harwood CBE
- Margaret Gentle Harwood, from a 1986 newspaper
- Born: Margaret Gentle about 1925; Suffolk
- Died: 23 June 2004 (age 79); Suffolk
- Occupations: Educator, school principal in Lagos
- Spouse: Peter Hedley Harwood

Margaret Gentle Harwood CBE (about 1925 – 23 June 2004) was a British educator in Ghana and Nigeria. From 1956 to 1963, she was principal of Queen's College, Lagos, and from 1963 to 1968 she was an adviser to the Nigerian Federal Ministry of Education.

== Early life and education ==
Gentle was from Brandon, Suffolk, the daughter of Walter George Gentle and Elizabeth Skelton Berry Gentle. She attended the University of Nottingham.

== Career ==
During World War II, Gentle served in the Women's Royal Naval Service. She joined the Colonial Education Service after the war, and taught at the Achimota School in Ghana, and at Queen's College in Ede. In 1956, she was arrested with a family friend, H. C. L. Heywood, the Provost of Southwell, while exploring ruins in Yugoslavia during a vacation. They were questioned under armed guard for several hours before they were released.

Gentle became principal of Queens College, Lagos, in 1956, during a time of internal and external tumult, as the school was expanding and moving into new buildings, while Nigeria was becoming independent and curricula changed to reflect this. When she left the principalship in 1963, she was succeeded by the school's first Nigerian principal, Iphigenia Efunjoke Coker.

From 1963 to 1968, Gentle was an adviser to the Federal Ministry of Education, inspecting colleges, attending ceremonies, and recruiting school administrators. She represented Nigeria at international meetings, especially at the Commonwealth Education Conference, held in Ottawa in 1964, and in Lagos in 1968. On leave in England in 1964, she gave a slide show about her work in Nigeria to the Women's Institute in Brandon.

After marriage, Harwood resigned from government work, and returned to teaching in Nigerian schools. She was awarded a CBE in 1969. The Harwoods returned the England in 1979. She remained active in women's international organizations after retirement.

== Publications ==
- "The Sixth Form in Nigerian Secondary Schools" (1965)

== Personal life ==
Gentle married fellow British educator Peter Hedley Harwood in 1968, in Lagos. She died in 2004, at the age of 79, in a hospital in Suffolk.
