= Sotonye Denton-West =

Nigerian judge

Sotonye Denton-West is a Nigerian judge and first female presiding as chief judge of the High Court of Rivers State, Nigeria. She is the first female judge from Rivers State to be appointed to the court of appeal.

== Education ==
Denton-West is from Buguma in Asari-Toru Local Government Area of Rivers State, Nigeria. She was born on September 15, 1946, in Lagos State to Chief Denton Victor West and Madam Stella Denton West. From 1953 until 1960 she attended Our Lady of Apostles, Yaba, Lagos, where she obtained her FSLC in 1960. Consequently, she proceeded to the prestigious Queen's College, Lagos for her secondary education and graduated in 1965. In 1970 she obtained her law degree from the University of Lagos.

== Career ==
She started her career in the legal profession in 1971. and in 1973 she started her own law firm. In 1986 she was named to the high court as a judge, and she was appointed chief judge in 2001. She was promoted to the Court of Appeal in 2005. She is the first female lawyer from Rivers State, and the first female judge. She retired in 2016, and upon her retirement she noted that she herself had been a victim of judicial corruption.
