= Spacecraft Atmosphere Monitor =

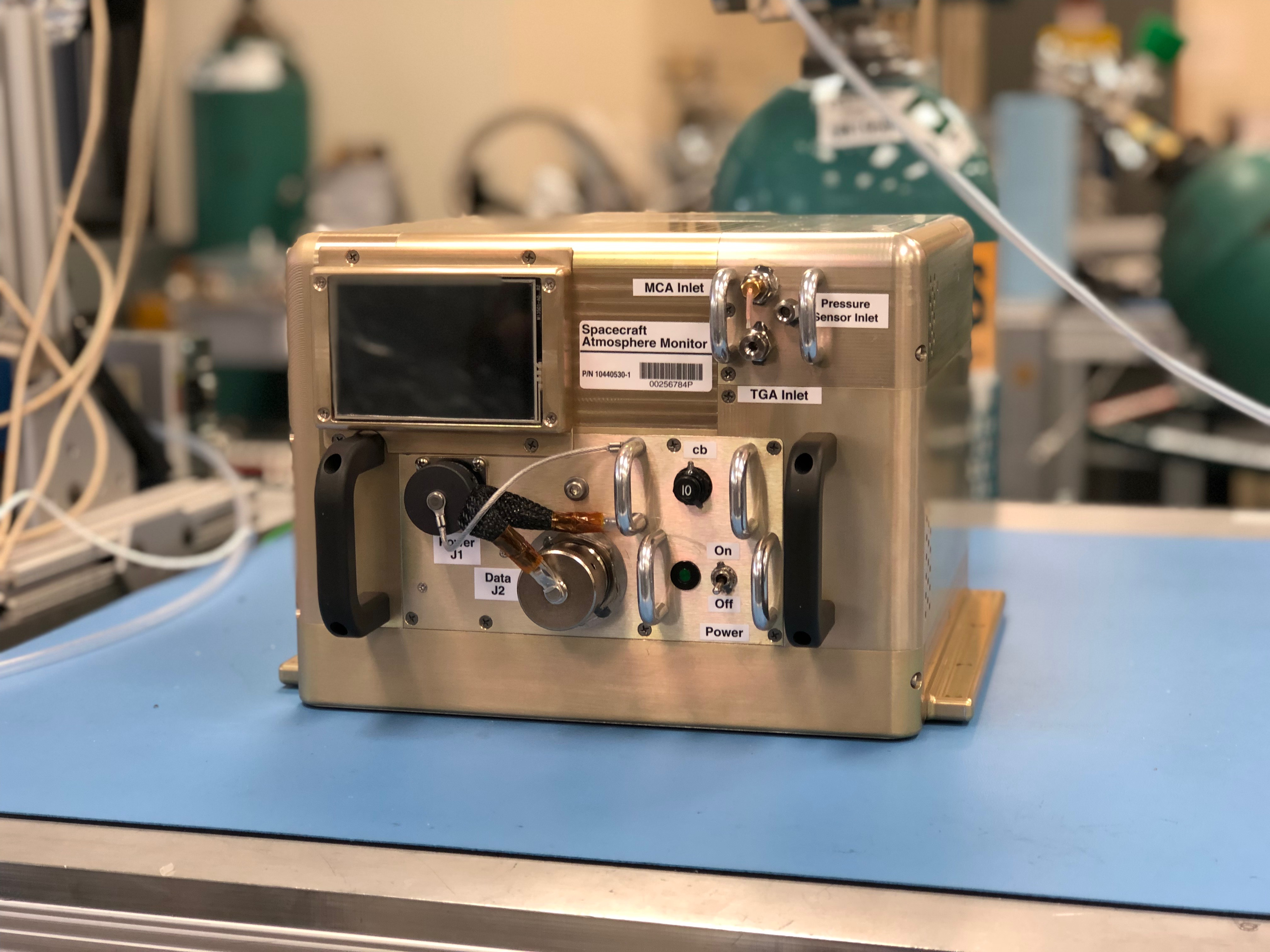
The Spacecraft Atmosphere Monitor

The Spacecraft Atmosphere Monitor (SCRAM) is a highly compact gas chromatograph mass spectrometer (GCMS) instrument built by JPL that is a technology demonstration on the International Space Station for monitoring the cabin atmosphere in human spacecraft. SCRAM measures both the major constituents (e.g. nitrogen, oxygen, and carbon dioxide) and trace parts per billion volatile chemicals (e.g. benzene, ethanol, siloxanes) in the spacecraft cabin atmosphere to ensure the health of the astronauts. SCRAM has a total mass of 9.5 kg and uses 40 W (nominal) during operation.

SCRAM is an advanced technology demonstration that can be employed on future crewed flight missions, like in the Artemis program and the Orion spacecraft. It was launched to ISS on a Dragon spacecraft on July 25, 2019, and began continuous operations on July 29, 2019. SCRAM was returned to earth aboard SpaceX-25 on Jan. 24, 2022 after almost two years of continuous operations aboard the ISS, exceeding its design lifetime goal of one year. The instrument was returned to JPL on Feb. 15, 2022.

This first SCRAM instrument will be refurbished and be flown, along with a second SCRAM unit (SCRAM-2), to ISS in late 2022. The two instruments operating at the same time will enable JPL scientists to continuously monitor the ISS cabin atmosphere for interesting or anomalous constituents and temporal or spatial variations in the cabin atmosphere.

== See also ==
- Human spaceflight
