= Pad Abort-1 =

2010 rocket test flight

Pad Abort 1
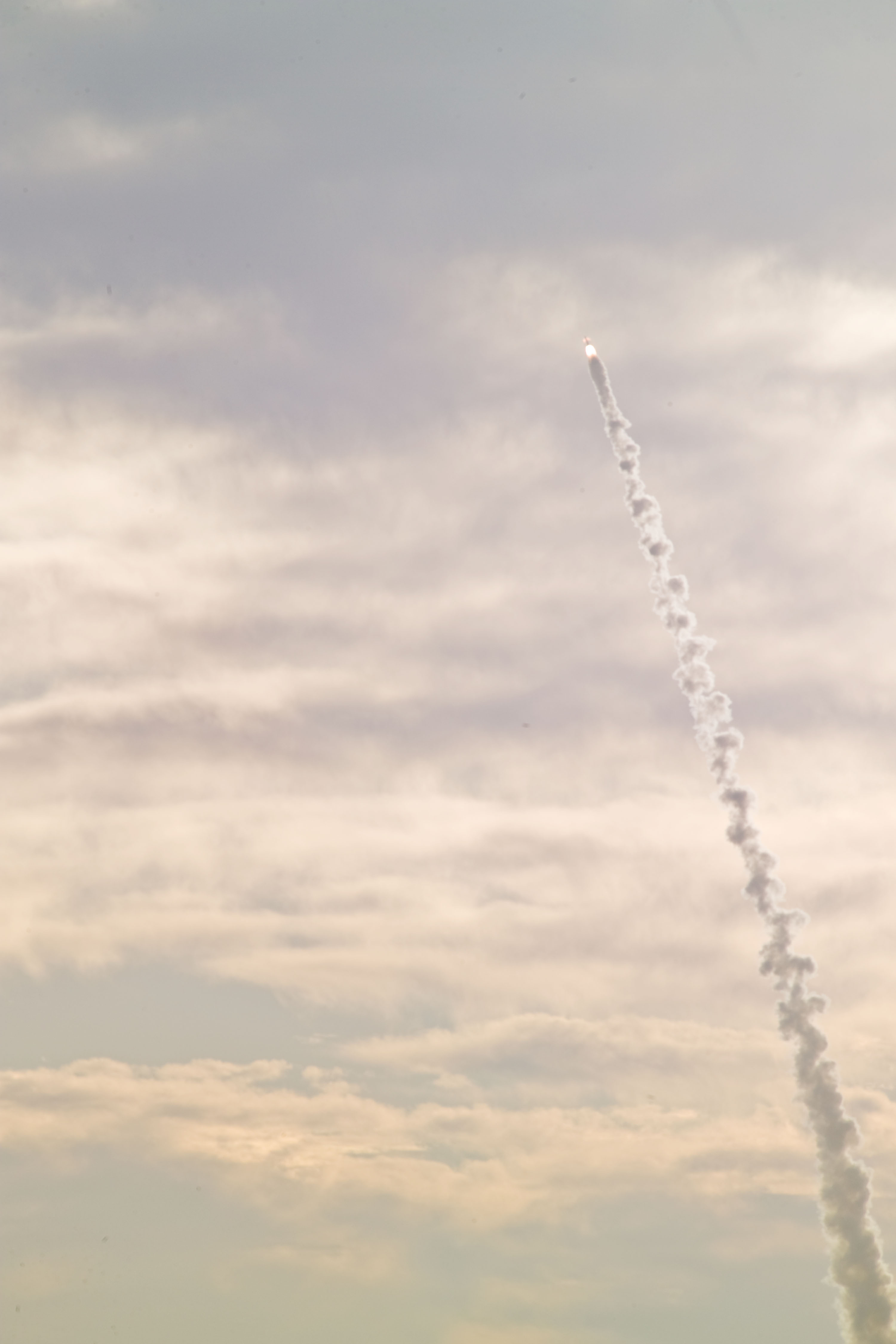
- Launch of the Pad Abort 1 test
- Mission type: Technology demonstration
- Operator: NASA
- Mission duration: 1 minute, 35 seconds
- Distance travelled: 2.1 km (6,900 ft)
- Apogee: 1.8 km (6,000 ft)

Spacecraft properties
- Spacecraft type: Orion boilerplate

Start of mission
- Launch date: 6 May 2010, 13:03:00 UTC
- Rocket: Orion Launch Abort System
- Launch site: White Sands, LC-32E

End of mission
- Landing date: 6 May 2010, 13:04:35 UTC
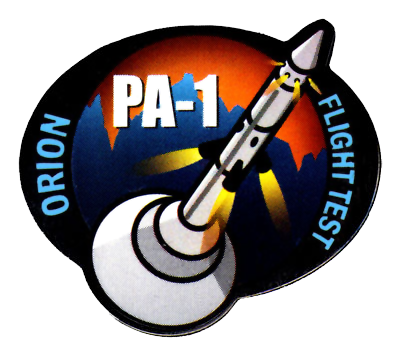
- Orion program Constellation program

Pad Abort 1 (PA-1) was a flight test of the Orion Launch Abort System (LAS). PA-1 was the first test in a sequence of atmospheric flight tests known as Orion Abort Flight Test (AFT).

PA-1 tested the basic functionality of the launch abort concept from the pad in its preliminary Orion design configuration. It used the former conformal shape of the LAS adapter. The Flight Test Article (FTA) vehicle differed from production Orion vehicles in a number of ways. For example, the FTA did not have a crew on board, and the avionics were a prototype of what is planned for production Orions.

The PA-1 test took place on 6 May 2010 at the U.S. Army's White Sands Missile Range in New Mexico. It was also the final flight done under the auspice of the Constellation program before it was cancelled.

== Spacecraft location ==
The Orion capsule used in the test is on display at the Virginia Air and Space Center in Hampton, Virginia.

== Gallery ==
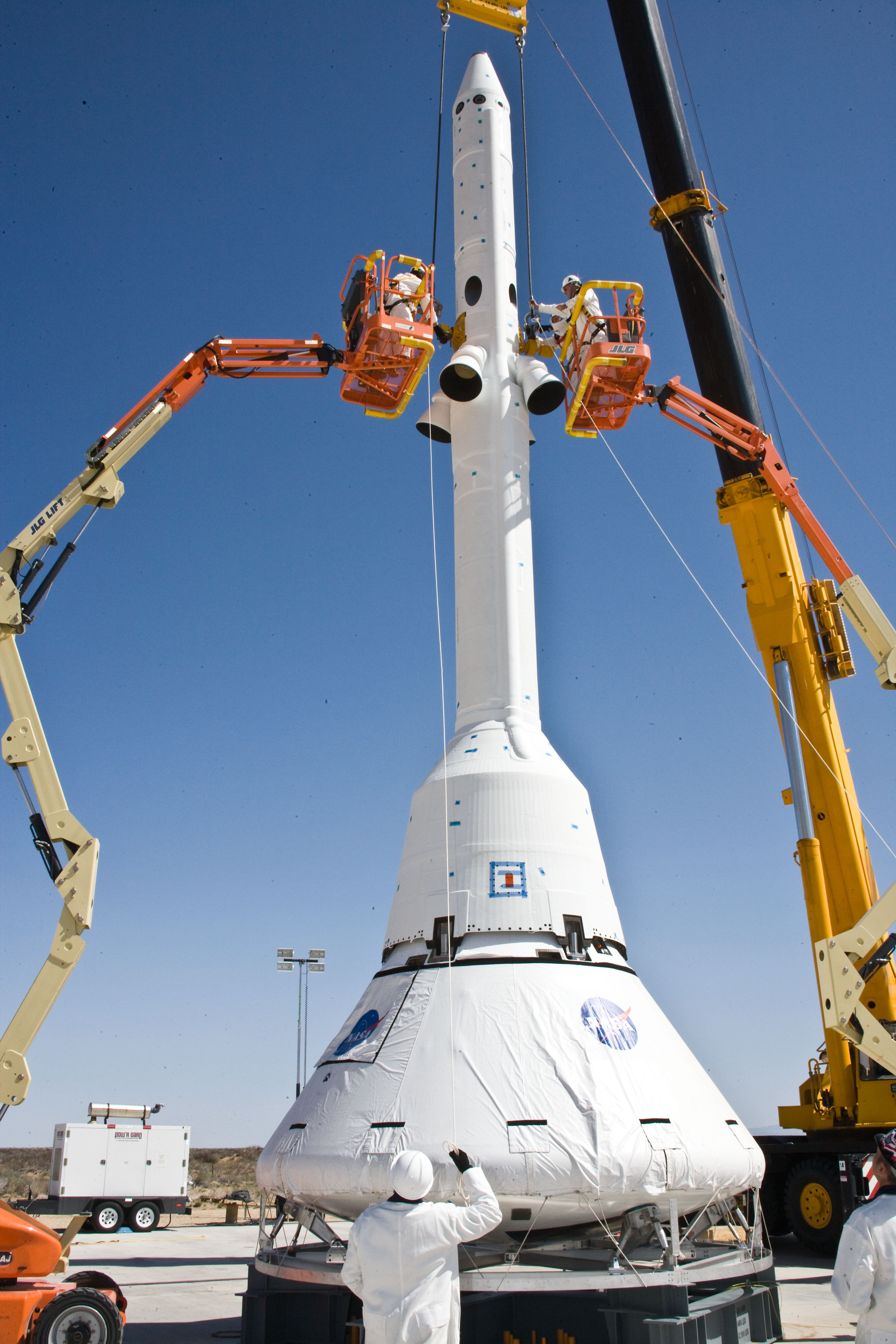
Pad Abort-1 (PA-1) stack at White Sands Missile Range, N.M.

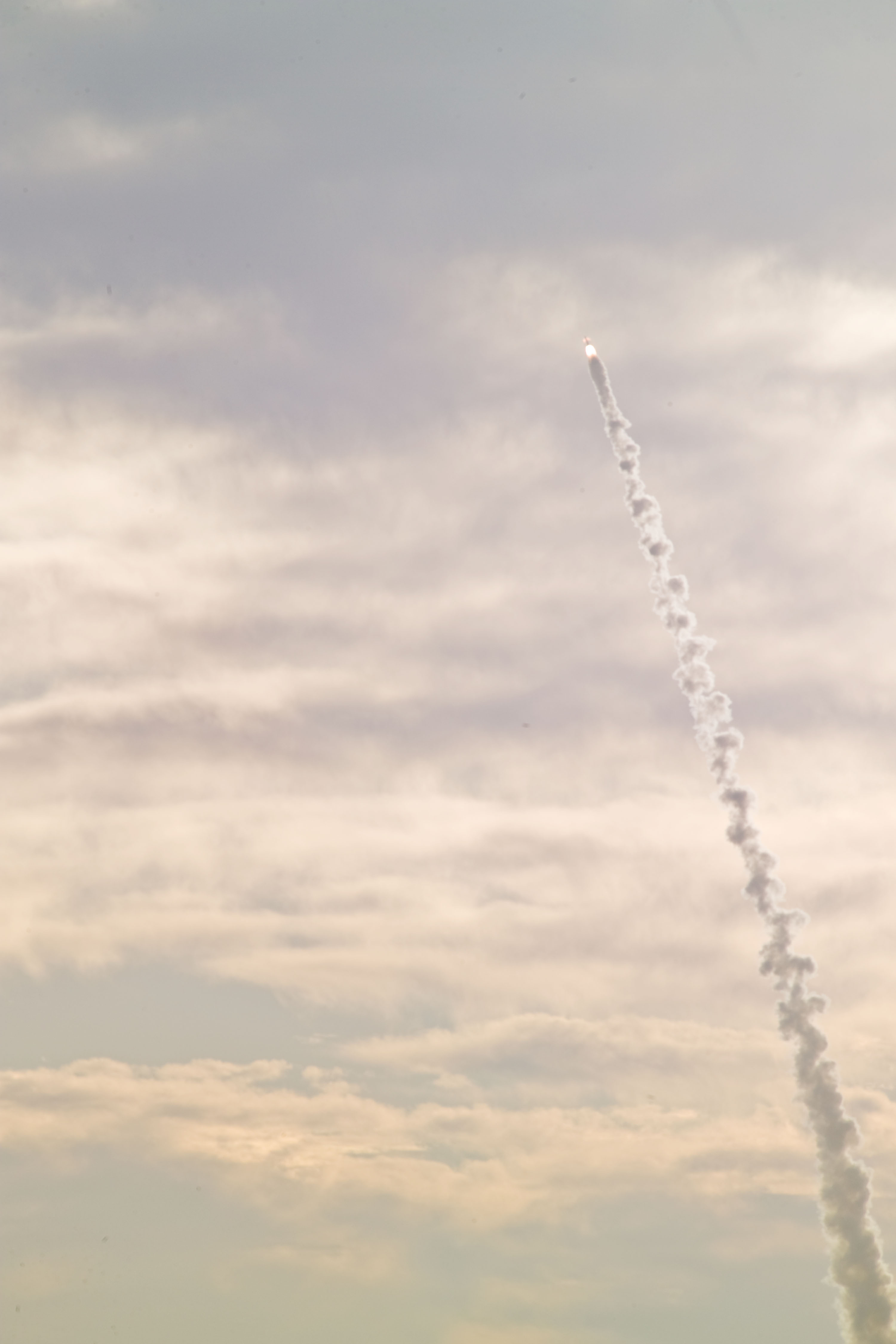
Pad Abort 1 (PA-1) launched May 6, 2010 at White Sands

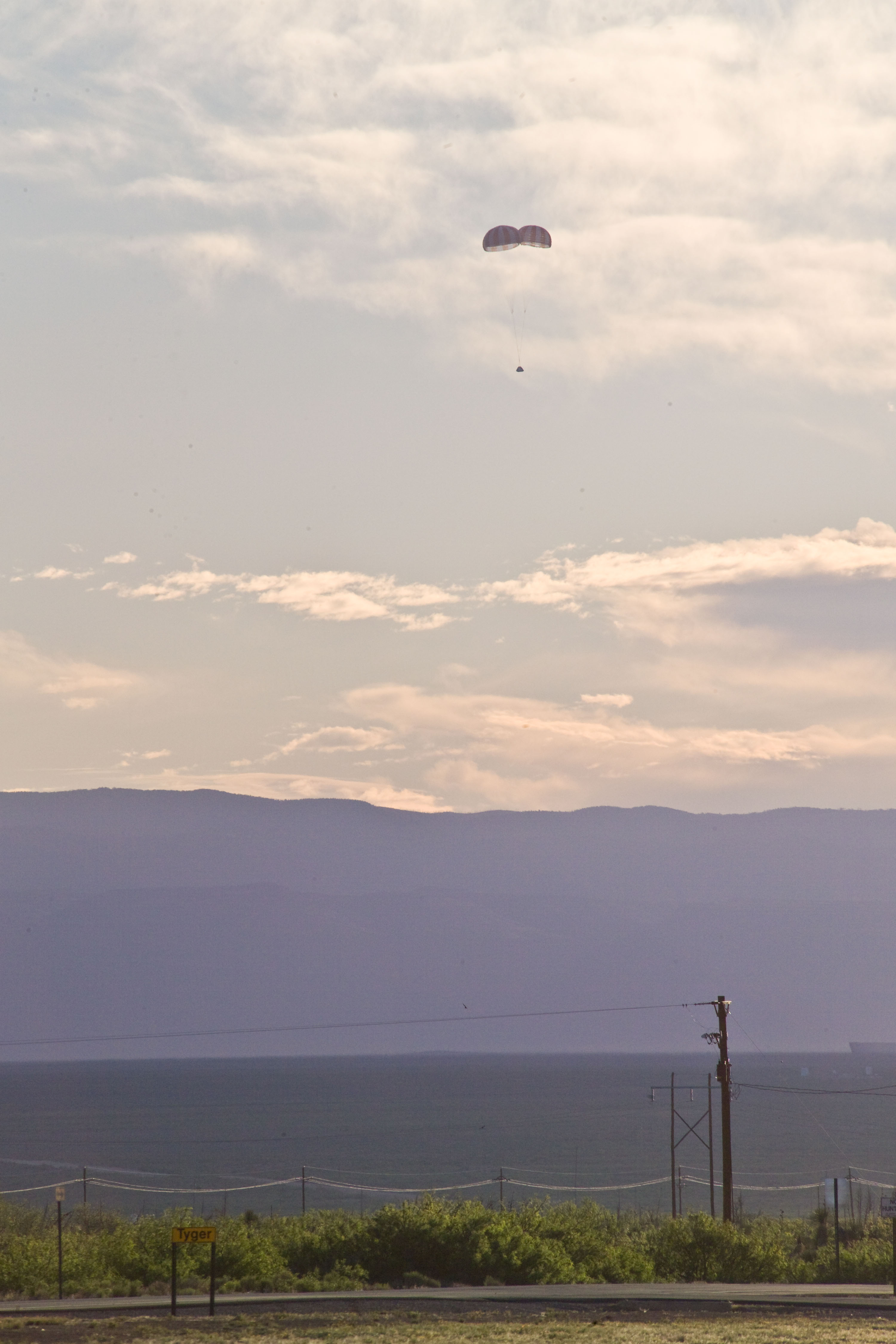
Parachute descending

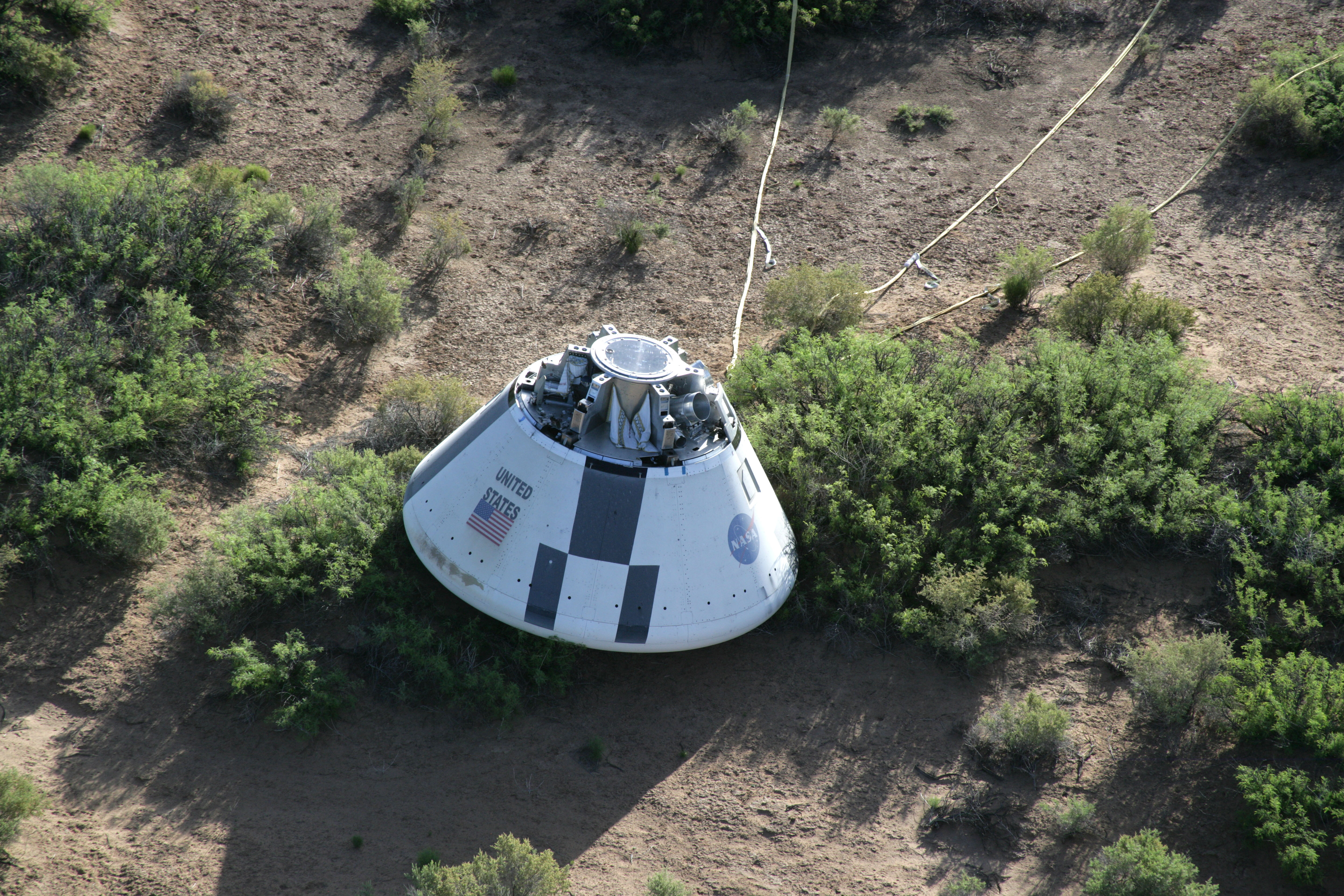
PA-1 Crew Module post landing

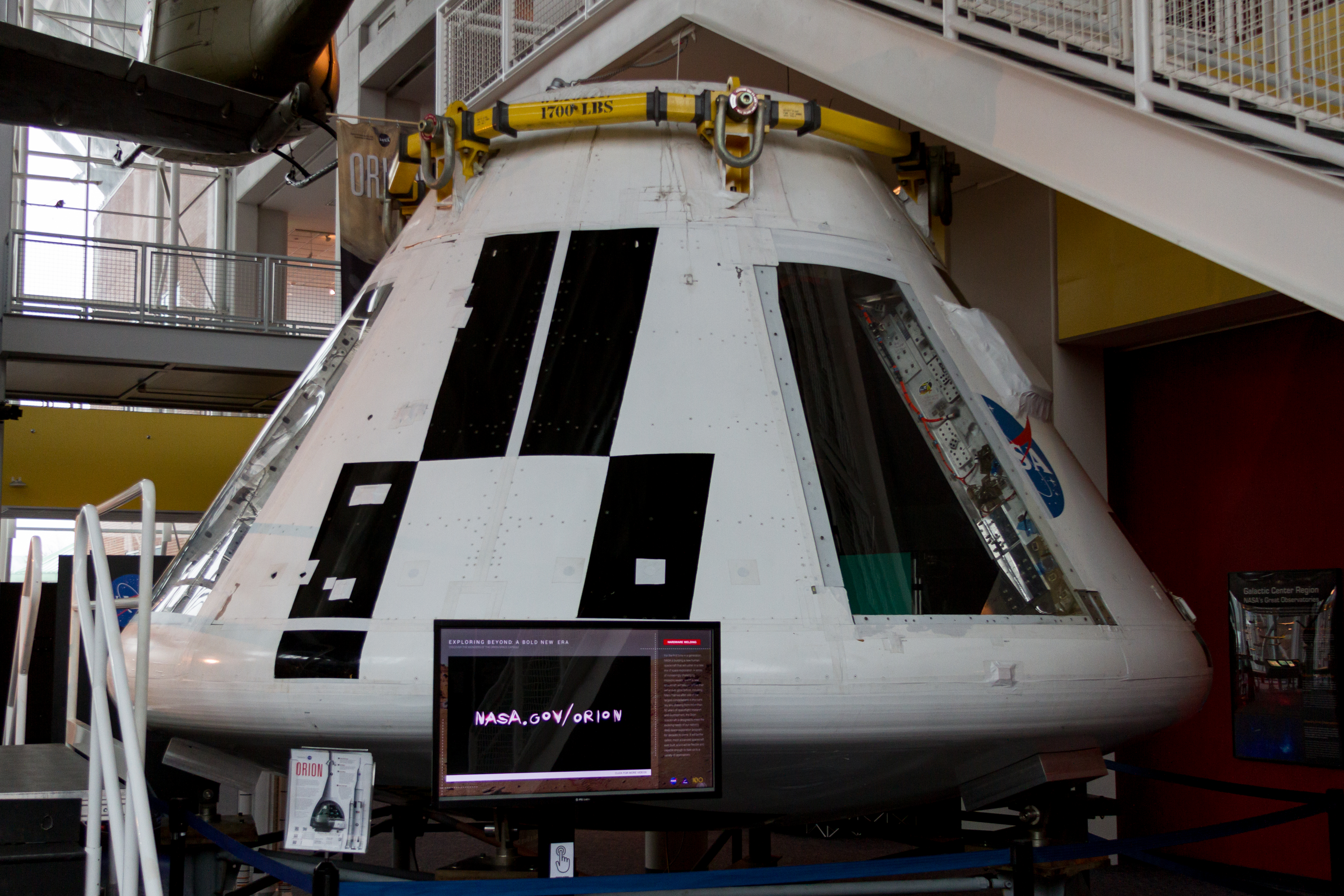
PA-1 on display at the Virginia Air and Space Center
