= Bosede Afolabi =

Nigerian medical researcher

- Born: Bosede Bukola Afolabi; July 1970 (age 56); London, United Kingdom
- Education: Queen's College, Lagos; Obafemi Awolowo University; University of Nottingham
- Occupations: Consultant Obstetrician, Gynaecologist & Professor
- Known for: IVON Trial, SPEC-AI Study, Maternal health research
- Website: bosedeafolabi.com

Bosede Bukola Afolabi (born 1970) is a Nigerian obstetrician, gynaecologist, academic, and maternal health researcher. She is a professor and a former head of the Department of Obstetrics and Gynaecology at the College of Medicine, Lagos University Teaching Hospital. Bosede is widely recognised for her research on maternal anaemia, sickle cell disease in pregnancy, and high-risk obstetric care in sub-saharan Africa. She is the founder and chairperson of the Maternal and Reproductive Health Collective, a nonprofit focused on research, advocacy, training, and also serves as Director at the Centre for Clinical Trials, Research and Implementation Science.

== Early life and education ==
Bosede was born in London in 1970. She completed her secondary education at Queen's College, Yaba, in Lagos, Nigeria. In 1992, she obtained her medical degree (MBChB) from Obafemi Awolowo University, Ile-Ife. She later pursued a Doctor of Medicine (DM) degree in Obstetrics and Gynaecology at the University of Nottingham in the United Kingdom, earning the degree 2011 with a research thesis titled Plasma volume in normal and sickle cell pregnancies.

She holds several postgraduate fellowships, including:

- Fellow of the Royal College of Obstetricians and Gynaecologists (FRCOG)
- Fellow of the West African College of Surgeons (FWACS)
- Fellow of the National Postgraduate Medical College of Nigeria (FMCOG)

In addition, she earned a Diploma in Medical Education from the Foundation for the Advancement of International Medical Education and Research and a Certificate in Biostatistics and Epidemiology from the Harvard T.Chan School of Public Health in Boston, U.S.

== Career ==
=== Academic and clinical roles ===
Bosede began her clinical training in the United Kingdom, where she served as a senior house officer in Obstetrics and Gynaecology and Specialist Registrar in hospitals such as Central Middlesex Hospital and Hull Royal Infirmary, North Yorkshire. She returned to Nigeria in 1998 and became a Senior Registrar in the Department of Obstetrics and Gynaecology at Lagos University Teaching Hospital in 2000. By 2002, she had risen to the position of Consultant Obstetrician and Gynaecologist.

That same year, she joined the College of Medicine, University of Lagos, as a Lecturer II and progressed through the academic ranks to become a full professor in 2016. She served as Head of the Department of Obstetrics and Gynaecology at Lagos University Teaching Hospital from 2018 to 2021 and was reappointed to the role in August 2022.

Between 2019 and 2022, Bosede also contributed to academic publishing, first as assistant editor and later as editor-in-chief of the Journal of the West African College of Surgeons.

=== Leadership ===
Afolabi holds several roles in national and international organisations. She currently serves as:

- Director, Centre for Clinical Trials, Research and Implementation Science.
- Founder and chairperson, Maternal & Reproductive Health Collective.
- President, Association of Fetomaternal Medicine Specialists of Nigeria, since July 2023.
- Board member, Ekiti State University Teaching Hospital.
- Chairman, Kensington Adebukola Adebutu Foundation Laboratory and Maternity Centre.

== Research ==
Bosede's research centres on maternal medicine, with a particular focus on anaemia in pregnancy, sickle cell disease and high-risk obstetric care. She has authored over 128 peer-reviewed publications and supervised numerous postgraduates theses, including more than 20 masters and PhD dissertations.

She has worked with academic and research institutions globally, including the University of Nottingham, Karolinska Institute, London School of Hygiene and Tropical Medicine, Harvard T.Chan School of Public Health, Mayo Clinic, Northeastern University, and the Institute of Tropical Medicine in Belgium.

=== Major trials ===
Afolabi has led or co-led several clinical trials and research projects focused on improving maternal health outcomes in Nigeria:

- IVON Trial (Lancet Glob Health, Oct 2024): A multicentre randomised study comparing intravenous ferric carboxymaltose with oral iron for the treatment of antenatal anaemia among 1,056 women in Lagos and Kano. Funded by the Bill & Melinda Gates Foundation.
- IVON-PP (2024): A postpartum anaemia implementation trial published in BMJ Open.
- IVON-IS (2022-2025): A study assessing implementation strategies for IV iron therapy in antenatal care.
- CAPREMAN (2024-2028): A comprehensive program addressing maternal anaemia through clinical and community interventions.
- SPEC-AI (2022-2023): A project using artificial intelligence to screen for peripartum cardiomyopathy, in collaboration with the Mayo Clinic.
- PIPSICKLE Trial (2020-2022): A Tertiary Education Trust Fund-supported study on the use of low-dose aspirin to prevent intrauterine growth restriction and preeclampsia in pregnant women with sickle cell disease.

She is also the Country Principal Investigator for multiple National Institutes of Health/Fogarty and Tertiary Education Trust Fund-funded projects.

== Advocacy and public engagement ==
A passionate advocate for maternal health, Bosede has been featured in several international media platforms. In 2023, she appeared on CNN African Voices for her work in maternal medicine and efforts to reduce maternal mortality among women with sickle cell disease.

Her advocacy and research have been profiled by CNN, Arise TV, BBC, Daily Trust, The Punch, Quartz Africa, World Economic Forum, and The Guardian Nigeria, amongst others.

She was also a featured speaker at the 2023 Gates Foundation Goalkeepers event organised by the Bill & Melinda Gates Foundation during the 78th United Nations General Assembly, where she spoke about lifesaving interventions for maternal anaemia.

== Honors and awards ==
Afolabi's contributions to clinical research and maternal health have earned her numerous accolades, including:

- Fellow of the Nigerian Academy of Medicine (FAMedS), 2021
- Fellow of the Nigerian Academy of Science (FNAS), 2023
- Eisenhower Fellowship (2014).
- Special Recognition Award, Physician of the Year Committee, 2021
- Excellence in Research Award, Society of Obstetricians & Gynaecologists of Nigeria (SOGON), 2022.
- Ojo Memorial Lecturer, SOGON's 56th Annual Scientific Conference, 2022.

== Selected publications ==
- Afolabi BB et al. (2024). Intravenous versus oral iron for anaemia among pregnant women in Nigeria (IVON). Lancet Global Health.
- Afolabi BB et al. (2024). IVON-PP: Intravenous ferric carboxymaltose vs oral iron for postpartum anaemia, BMJ Open.
- Afolabi BB et al. (2024). Acceptability of IV iron therapy in Nigeria, Reproductive Health.
- Afolabi BB (2011). Plasma volume in sickle cell pregnancies. Doctor of Medicine Thesis, University of Nottingham.

== Grants and fellowships ==
Bosede is the principal investigator on multiple national and international grants. Her work has been funded by the Bill & Melinda Gates Foundation, the National Institutes of Health, and Nigeria's Tertiary Education Trust Fund. Her organisation, the Maternal & Reproductive Health Collective, continues to drive evidence-based advocacy, capacity building, and research implementation in Nigeria's reproductive health sector.
