= Max Launch Abort System =

Proposed launch escape system for the Orion spacecraft

Fabrication and launch of the MLAS test vehicle

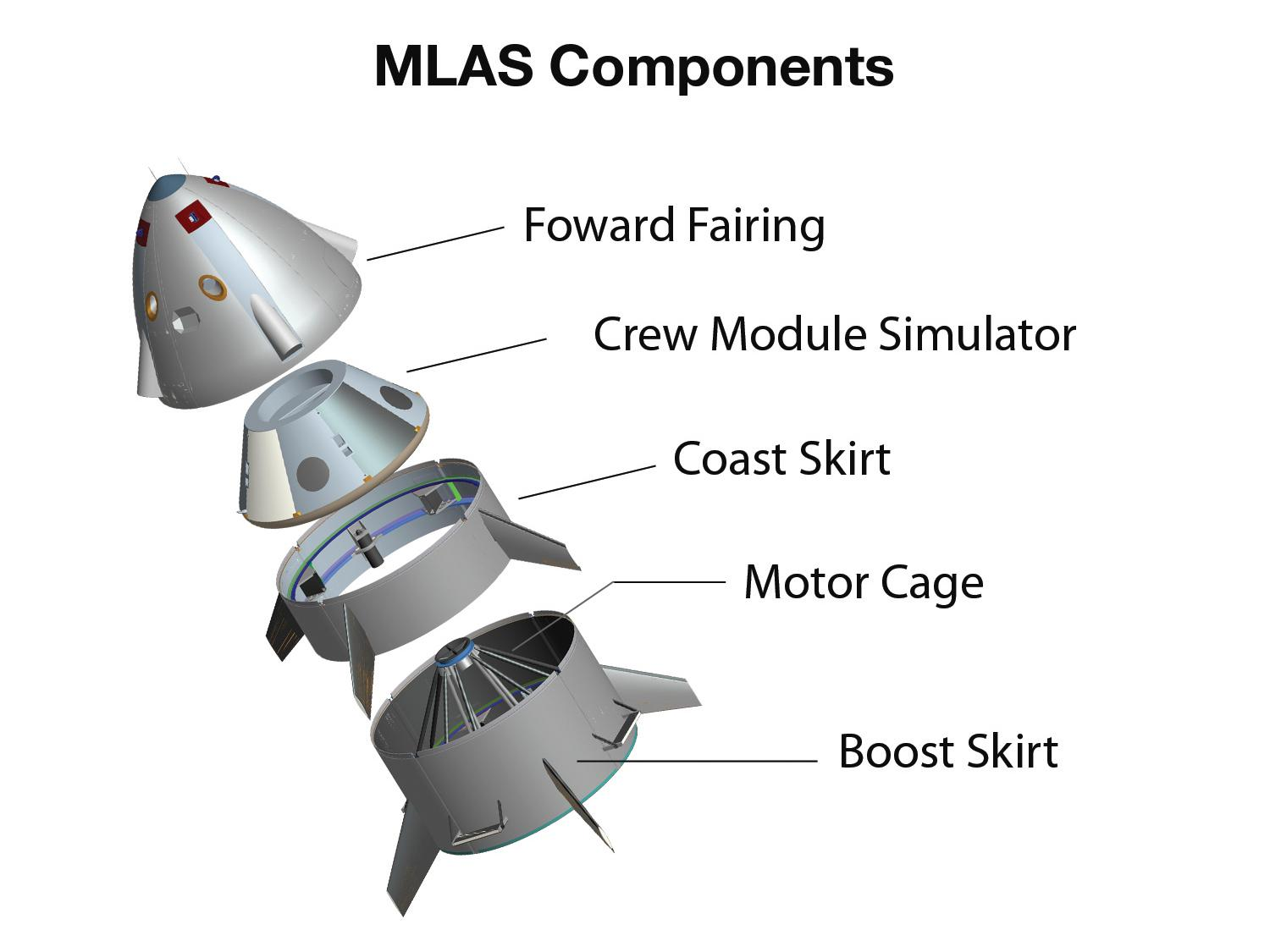
Components of the MLAS test vehicle

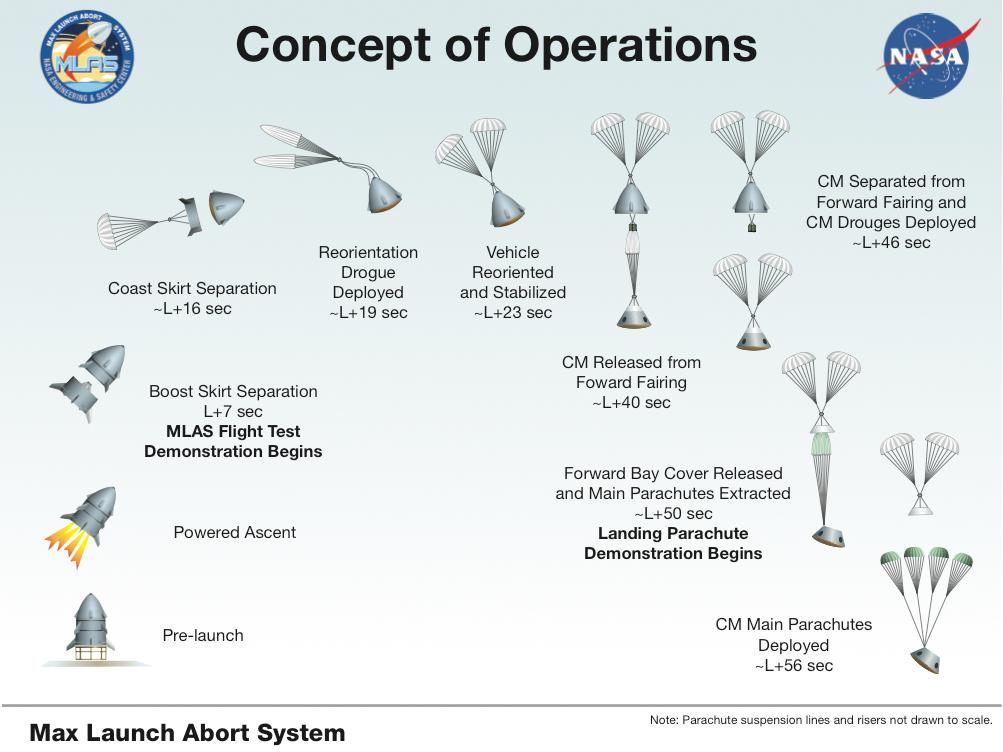
MLAS test vehicle flight profile

The Max Launch Abort System (MLAS) was a proposed alternative to the traditional "tractor" Launch escape system (LES) for NASA's Orion spacecraft during the Constellation program. Named in honor of NASA engineer Maxime Faget, who pioneered the escape tower concept, the MLAS was developed as a risk-mitigation project by the NASA Engineering and Safety center.(NESC).

Designed by NASA engineers and reported on the website NASASpaceFlight.com on December 6, 2007, the proposed MLAS used four existing Huntsville-built Thiokol solid-rocket motors (built in 1988) placed at 90° intervals within the Orion's bullet-shaped fairing. The fairing was originally designed to protect the Orion spacecraft from aerodynamic stresses during launch and to provide an interface between the spacecraft's crew module with the LES.

The MLAS was designed with the aim of reducing the height of the Orion/Ares I stack while also reducing weight and center-of-gravity issues of a traditional LES. The bullet-shaped MLAS was also expected to provide better aerodynamic qualities during the first two minutes of flight, reducing stresses when the vehicle encounters the "max Q" region of hypersonic flight. The MLAS was also expected to simplify production, as existing hardware would be employed.

There are several drawbacks to MLAS. First, the bullet-shaped protective cover would have to be modified and reinforced to allow for the use of the solid-rocket motors, something not needed with the LES, which bolts on top of the LIDS docking ring assembly. Second, the necessity to fire multiple motors (LES uses one motor and multiple nozzles) simultaneously for an abort decreases the theoretical reliability of the launch abort system by introducing more failure modes.

Like the existing LES, the MLAS would provide protection to the Orion spacecraft crew during the first 2 1/2 minutes of flight, with the MLAS being jettisoned, along with the service module's fairing panels, after the solid-rocket first stage was jettisoned.

The MLAS concept was dropped with the cancellation of the Constellation program and the redesign of Orion for the Space Launch System However, the integrated "pusher" abort system concept has seen renewed interest in commercial spaceflight. Both SpaceX's Crew Dragon, with its side-mounted SuperDraco engines, and Boeing Starliner employ a similar pusher architecture that integrates the abort system into the spacecraft rather than using a separate tower.

== July 2009 test launch ==
A "pad abort" flight test of the Max Launch Abort System was performed at NASA's Wallops Flight Facility on July 8, 2009, at 10:26 UTC. A primary test goal was the successful separation of a mock crew capsule from the abort system. The test vehicle weighed over 45,000 pounds (20,000 kg) and was over 33 feet (10 m) tall.

The test vehicle had several differences from the actual proposed system. The main difference was that the four propulsion rockets were not located in the forward fairing, but in a boost skirt located at the bottom of the test vehicle. The rockets in the fairing were represented by geometric dummies. The propulsion thrust was not balanced between the rockets by a manifold system, contrary to what was foreseen with the actual system.

The test marked the first demonstration of a passively stabilized launch abort system in this size and weight class, and it provided valuable aerodynamic and performance data to validate analytical models. The project was completed less than two years after its inception, involving a team that included both junior engineers and Apollo-era Veterans.
