= Queen's College, Lagos =

College in Nigeria

Coordinates: 6.50767815°N 3.3815814°E

Information
- School type: State boarding school
- Motto: Pass On The Torch
- Established: October 10, 1927; 98 years ago
- Sister school: King's College, Lagos
- Teaching staff: c.300
- Gender: Girls
- Enrollment: 3505 (2022-2023)
- Average class size: 55
- Houses: Dan-Fodio; Obasa; Obi; Emotan; Efunjoke; Obong

Queen's College, Lagos, is a government-owned girls' secondary (high) school with boarding facilities, situated in Yaba, Lagos, Nigeria. Often referred to as the "sister college" of King's College, Lagos, it was founded on October 10, 1927, when Nigeria was still a British colony.

Nigeria has a 6-3-3-4 system of education. Queen's College takes the secondary pupils in the middle two phases. There are six year groups, or grades; each year group contains about 600 students divided into several arms. Recently, class sizes are an average of 55 per class. The total population for the 2022/2023 session was 3505 students.

The school has returned the best results nationwide in the West African Senior School Certificate Examination (WASSCE) conducted by the West African Examinations Council (WAEC) seven times since 1985 and is widely considered to be one of the top schools in Nigeria, and one of the top girls' schools on the African continent. The Queen's College motto is "Pass On The Torch".

== History ==
Queen's College was established on October 10, 1927, with an enrolment of 20 students, a Principal and eight part-time teachers. Sylvia Leith-Ross was appointed "Lady Superintendent of Education" in 1925 and she helped to establish Queen's College as a girls' boarding school.

Queen's College has grown to a population 3000 students, and a staff strength of well over 300 full-time teachers.

Queen's College has provided education for girls in Nigeria - creating equal gender opportunities for them in professional fields. Girls are given the opportunity to pursue courses in the Sciences, Medicine, Engineering, Law, Architecture, the Arts, etc.

Though originally established in 1927, Queen's College is now one of 104 unity schools in Nigeria managed by the federal government to bring together children from different geographic, ethnic, and socio-economic backgrounds to build Nigeria's future, especially in the aftermath of the Biafran War.

== Structure ==
The school operates at two levels: junior and senior school. The lowest forms, JS I to JS III, make up the junior school. Students in those forms study for the Junior School Certificate Examination conducted by the National Examination Council (NECO) and taken at the end of their third year. The Senior School Examination is the goal of the students in the upper forms.

Two examination bodies – West African Examinations Council and National Examinations Council – are each empowered to conduct separately the end-of-course examination and students are to enter for both examinations.

The senior and junior schools are distinct in their operations. Each stream of JS 1 through SS 3 has about eleven classrooms with varying numbers of students.

== Curriculum ==
The curriculum of the school covers Science, Social Science, Arts -and vocational subjects as well as co-curricular activities. In line with the 6-3-3 4 system of education, the scope has been enlarged to give a broad-based education with subjects that can lead to courses in tertiary institutions.

Subjects offered in both Junior and Senior schools are:

- English Language, Literature-in-English, History
- Mathematics, Further mathematics
- Social Studies, Geography
- Integrated Science (Biology, Chemistry and Physics)
- French Language
- Business Studies, Economics, Commerce, Accounting
- Introductory Technology
- Christian Religious Studies/Islamic Religious Studies
- Nigerian language - Yoruba/Hausa/Igbo Languages
- Agric/PHE
- Arabic
- Music/Fine art
- Home Economics
- Typewriting
- Computer Studies
- Government
- Trading
- Insurance/Book -keeping
- Home economics/Food And Nutrition/Clothing And Textile.

The girls are involved in games and sports. The annual inter-house sports competition is usually held during the second term of the academic session. The school has six houses that compete in the inter-house games, namely Dan-Fodio (Red House), Obasa (Blue House), Obi (Yellow House), Emotan (Green House), Efunjoke (Purple House) and Obong (Orange House).

== Principals ==
- Miss F. Wordsworth (later Mrs. Tolfree) - 1927 to 1930
- Miss W. W. Blackwell - 1931 to 1942
- Mrs. D. Mather - 1942 to 1944
- Dr. Alice Whittaker - 1944 to 1946
- Miss Ethel Hobson - 1946 to 1950
- Miss Mary Hutcheson -1950 to 1954
- Miss Joyce Moxon - 1954 to 1955
- Miss Margaret Gentle (later Mrs. Harwood) - 1956 to 1963
- Mrs. I. E. Coker - 1963 to 1977 (First Nigerian principal of Queen's college)
- Mrs. T. E. Chukwuma - 1978 to 1982
- Mrs. A. A, Kafaru - 1982 to 1986
- Mrs. J. E. Ejueyitche - 1986 to 1987
- Mrs. J. Namme - 1987 to 1991
- Mrs. H. E. G. Marinho - 1991 to 1996
- Mrs. M. T. F. Sojinrin - 1996 to 2001
- Mrs. O. O. Euler-Ajayi - 2001 to 2004
- Mrs. M. B. Abolade - 2004 to 2006
- Mrs. O. Togonu-Bickersteth - 2006 to 2008
- Mrs. A. C. Onimole - 2008 to 2010
- Mrs. A. Ogunnaike - 2010 to 2011
- Mrs. M. O. A. Ladipo - 2011 - 2012
- Mrs E. M. Osime - 2012 - 2015
- Dr Mrs Lami Amodu - 2015 - 2017
- Mrs B. A. Are - 2017 - 2018
- Dr Mrs Oyinloye Yakubu - 2018 - 2022
- Dr. Mrs. A. O. Obabori - 2022 till date

== Notable alumni ==
- Suzanne Iroche, CEO of FinBank
- Claire Ighodaro, née Ukpoma, management accountant
- Phebean Ogundipe née Itayemi, author, educator and the first Nigerian woman to be published in English
- Modupe Omo-Eboh, first female judge in Nigeria
- Sefi Atta, award-winning writer
- Sotonye Denton-West, Nigerian judge
- Lara George, award-winning Gospel artiste
- Honey Ogundeyi, founder of Fashpa
- Grace Alele-Williams, first female vice chancellor of a Nigerian university
- Prof. Folashade Ogunsola, medical microbiologist
- Adaku Ufere, international lawyer and energy expert
- Uche Chika Elumelu, actor
- Gbemi Olateru Olagbegi, media personality
- Tosyn Bucknor, media personality
- Toni Tones, actress
- Njideka Akunyili Crosby, artist
- Bosede Afolabi, gynecologist
- Wendy Okolo, first Black woman to obtain a Ph.D. degree in aerospace engineering from University of Texas at Arlington
- Winifred Ekanem Oyo-Ita, former Head of the Civil Service of the Federation

== See also ==
  - Oyinkansola Abayomi
  - Kofoworola Ademola
  - Federal Government College Ikot Ekpene
  - Federal Government Girls College, Benin City
