= Space policy of the second Trump administration =

The space policy of the second Donald Trump administration is mainly based around the Golden Dome missile defense system, expanding the commercial spaceflight industry, and returning to the Moon.

== Budget ==
=== 2026 ===
President Trump's FY26 Budget prioritizes NASA human space exploration of both the Moon and Mars, focuses on high-priority scientific research, and transitions the Artemis effort to more sustainable and cost-efficient lunar missions. While the International Space Station will continue transitioning to commercially owned and operated space station in 2030, its onboard research will be on efforts critical to the exploration of the Moon and Mars.

The One Big Beautiful Bill Act allocated a new $10 billion for NASA. This includes $700 million for the Mars Telecommunications Network; $2.6 billion for the Lunar Gateway space station; $4.1 billion for the development of the Space Launch System rockets for the Artemis IV and Artemis V missions; $20 million for the Artemis IV Orion spacecraft; $1.25 billion for International Space Station operations throughout 2030; $325 million for the US Deorbit Vehicle; $1 billion for improvements at five NASA centers ($120 million for Stennis, $250 million for Kennedy, $300 million for Johnson, $100 million for Marshall, and $30 million for Michoud); $85 million to transfer a space vehicle to a field center that is involved in the administration of the Commercial Crew Program (aimed at moving Space Shuttle Discovery to the Johnson Space Center).

While the One Big Beautiful Bill Act allocates almost $10 billion in additional funding for NASA through 2032 covering missions to the Moon and Mars, the White House proposed NASA's FY26 budget to be reduced by about 24%, and preparations were made in anticipation of these cuts.

== Golden Dome missile defense system ==
On January 27, 2025, President Donald Trump signed an executive order entitled "Iron Dome for America". The order tasked the Department of Defense with developing a national missile defense system to counter ballistic, hypersonic, advanced cruise missiles, and other next-generation aerial attacks. The initiative was renamed in February 2025 from "Golden Dome for America," because Iron Dome is a registered trademark of Israeli defense contractor Rafael, some said. In May 2025, President Trump announced that the Golden Dome will put U.S. weapons in space within three years, at a projected cost of $175 billion, with a focus on countering potential missile threats from China and Russia. The system, with the 2028 deadline, will have four layers: one satellite-based and three land-based, with 11 short-range batteries spread across the continental U.S., Alaska, and Hawaii.

=== History ===
President Trump announcing the Golden Dome program in the Oval Office with the Secretary of Defense

On May 20, 2025, Trump announced plans for a new space-based missile defense system called the "Golden Dome." Intended to shield the United States from long-range and hypersonic missile threats, the system draws inspiration from Israel's Iron Dome but is significantly broader in scope.

General Michael A. Guetlein of the U.S. Space Force has been appointed to lead the initiative. A down payment of $25 billion for Golden Dome was included in a Republican reconciliation spending bill. The Congressional Budget Office estimated that it could cost between $161 billion and $542 billion over 20 years, while Republican Senators involved in the program predicted the end cost would be "trillions of dollars." General Guetlein was officially nominated as Golden Dome's direct reporting program manager in June 2025 and confirmed by the Senate in July 2025. He assumed the position on July 21, 2025.

While terrestrial defenses developed, the vision of a full space-based shield remained a consistent goal for its proponents. The modern groundwork for Golden Dome was laid in 2017 by the SDI's former Deputy of Technology, and prominent Team B leader, Michael D. Griffin, who formed the Space Development Agency during the first Trump administration. Griffin long advocated for reusable launch vehicles to make the mass launching of weapons into space economically feasible. While the original Strategic Defense Initiative's attempts at this were short-lived, with the DC-X failing after a series of test flights, Griffin later encouraged and promoted funding of commercial reusable launch vehicles, which have since proven successful.

During his 2024 presidential campaign, Trump repeatedly mentioned the missile shield concept, often to mixed reception.

In May 2025, four months after the beginning of Trump's second presidency, forty-two members of US Congress, all Democrats, formally requested the DoD Inspector General review Elon Musk’s involvement in Golden Dome. They cited concerns over deviations from standard acquisition processes and a dome subscription model that could "give Musk undue influence over national security." Another key conflict of interest involves four-star general Terrence J. O'Shaughnessy, former head of U.S. homeland missile defense, who now reports directly to Musk at SpaceX. Michael D. Griffin, founder of the Space Development Agency behind Golden Dome, has also faced scrutiny. After traveling to Russia with a young Musk in 2001 to study ICBMs, Griffin steered $2 billion in NASA contracts to Musk's newfound space company. SpaceX has since secured missile-tracking satellite contracts through Griffin's SDA as part of its Starshield program. Griffin also helps lead Castelion, that seeks to mass-produce hypersonic weapons.

=== Assessment ===
The Arms Control Association has noted that the Putin regime has been working to ensure it can overcome the threat of a future U.S. space-based interceptor network by developing anti-satellite weapons. Beijing, meanwhile, may respond by increasing its nuclear-armed ballistic missile force.

Article I of the Outer Space Treaty states that space is "the province of all mankind" and forbids placing weapons of mass destruction in orbit. Some permanent members of the United Nations Security Council have expressed objections to the Golden Dome program, citing inconsistencies with this principle. The program's use of space for attacking targets on the ground (“left of launch” preemptive strike capabilities) has led to discussion over the legality under international law.

== Commercial space industry ==
In August 2025, President Trump signed an executive order titled Enabling Competition in the Commercial Space Industry to ease federal regulations on commercial rocket launches, including licensing, environmental reviews, and permitting processes.

== Executive Orders ==
On August 28th, 2025, President Trump signed Executive Order 14343 titled Further Exclusions From the Federal Labor-Management Relations Program to remove collective bargaining coverage for employees in certain government agencies, among those agencies was NASA.

On December 18th, 2025, President Trump signed Executive Order 14369 titled Ensuring American Space Superiority. This executive order lays out the goals of The Trump Administration's space policy. It targets a crewed lunar return by 2028 and early lunar outpost elements by 2030. It launches an initiative to fast-track nuclear reactors for orbit and the Moon by 2030. It prioritizes next generation missile defense prototypes by 2028. It seeks $50 billion in private investments, streamlined commercial procurement, and an ISS commercial replacement pathway by 2030. It replaces prior space traffic management frameworks and shifts national space traffic coordination to the office of science and technology policy. It modifies Space Policy Directive-3 to permit cost recovery models for basic space situational awareness and traffic management instead of mandating free services.

== See also ==
- Space policy of the first Trump administration
- United States Space Force

Preceded by Space policy of the Joe Biden administration	Space policy of the United States; 2025–present	Succeeded by –
