= Lunar Outpost (company) =

American private space company

- Type: Private
- Industry: Aerospace
- Founded: 2017; 9 years ago
- Founder: Justin Cyrus; Julian Cyrus; AJ Gemer; Forrest Meyen
- Headquarters: Golden, Colorado, US
- Number of employees: 200 (2024)
- Website: www.lunaroutpost.com

Lunar Outpost is a private space company headquartered in Golden, Colorado, US. It is active in the areas of space robotics, lunar surface mobility, and space resources. The company developed the Mobile Autonomous Prospecting Platform (MAPP) rover, which operated at the lunar South Pole in 2025, and holds a contract to develop a Lunar Terrain Vehicle (LTV) for the Artemis Program.

== History ==
The company was formed in 2017. Lunar Outpost is also one of three finalists to develop the Lunar Terrain Vehicle (LTV) for the Artemis Program. On the IM-3 mission, Lunar Outpost will explore Reiner Gamma.

== Locations ==
The company operates offices across three continents, including North America, Europe, and Oceania.

The headquarters is located in Golden, Colorado. The facility includes a mission control center and a regolith simulant pit, which is used for testing platforms under conditions that simulate the lunar surface. Additionally, the Golden location houses facilities for the design, manufacturing, and testing of lunar rovers. Lunar Outpost's 1000-acre Lunar Vehicle Testing Facility is located in Southern Colorado.

Lunar Outpost EU is located in Luxembourg and was established in 2022. This office focuses on thermal energy collection, control, and storage technologies. The LUX-Thermal energy system is currently being developed as a solution for long-term electrical and thermal energy on the lunar surface to survive the lunar night and enhance daytime operations. The first technology created by this office, an active thermal switch, flew onboard Lunar Outpost's Lunar Voyage 1 in 2025. The team has a contract with the Luxembourg Space Agency.

Lunar Outpost Oceania is located in Melbourne, Australia and was established in 2022. This office focuses on mobility platforms and rovers for robotic exploration and payload services on planetary bodies.

== Missions ==
=== Lunar Voyage 1 ===
Lunar Voyage 1 (LV-1), a lunar rover built on the Mobile Autonomous Prospecting Platform (MAPP), launched in February 2025 and landed at the lunar South Pole in March 2025. The company designed and built the LV-1 MAPP lunar rover carried to the lunar surface by the IM-2 mission. The rover was intended to demonstrate ISRU on the lunar surface and deploy the first cellular network on another planetary body in partnership with Nokia. The mission launched February 26, 2025 aboard a SpaceX Falcon 9 rocket and reached the lunar South Pole via the IM-2 lunar lander. The lander experienced an off-nominal landing, coming to rest on its side and was unable to deploy the MAPP rover.

Some payloads onboard included antennas from Nokia to establish the first cellular network on another planetary body, three payloads from MIT, and a regolith collection mechanism intended to complete the first sale of space resources with NASA. The rover also carried a payload from Juventus FC, making them the first football club represented on the Moon. To commemorate the mission, Juventus released a capsule collection with Lunar Outpost and Adidas. On Lunar Voyage 1, Lunar Outpost’s Stargate Mission Control Software reached TRL 9 and maintained an uptime of 99.998%.

=== Lunar Voyage 2 ===
Launching in 2027 with IM-3, Lunar Voyage 2 will deploy a MAPP (mobile autonomous prospecting platform) rover to explore Reiner Gamma, a lunar region known for its mysterious magnetic anomaly that has perplexed scientists for centuries. The mission will be conducted in collaboration with the Johns Hopkins University Applied Physics Laboratory (JHU APL) and NASA. The data collected from Lunar Voyage 2 is expected to shed light on the Moon's magnetic properties and contribute to a deeper understanding of the Solar System's history.

=== Lunar Voyage 3 ===
Launching 2027, Lunar Voyage 3 will provide mobility for scientific and commercial payloads on the Moon. SpaceX will be the launch provider, and Intuitive Machines will be the landing provider for this mission.

=== Roo-ver mission ===
Lunar Outpost Oceania is Technical Lead for the Roo-ver mission, developing Australia's first lunar rover. In late 2024, the ELO₂ Consortium, co-led by Lunar Outpost Oceania and EPE, was selected by the Australian Space Agency to deliver the mission. Its objective is to demonstrate Australian capabilities in remote operations, robotics, and advanced systems engineering on the surface of the Moon.

Once deployed, Roo-ver will operate semi-autonomously and be remotely controlled from Earth. Its mission includes traversing the lunar surface, working with NASA to examine the composition of the regolith to help determine whether it contains substances of interest for sustained human activities on the Moon.

Funded by the Australian Government, through a $42 million grant from the Australian Space Agency, alongside co-contributions from consortium members, Roo-ver is expected to launch later this decade and operate for the duration of one lunar day, approximately 14 Earth days.

== Lunar Outpost Eagle (Lunar Terrain Vehicle) ==
Eagle Lunar Terrain Vehicle in 2025

The Lunar Terrain Vehicle (LTV) is an unpressurized lunar rover under development by NASA to support the Artemis program's goal of returning humans to the Moon and establishing a sustainable presence. The Eagle LTV is designed to transport astronauts and cargo across the lunar surface.

In April 2024, NASA selected three companies, including Lunar Outpost, to advance the development of the LTV, tasked with creating rover concepts capable of operating in the Moon's extreme environment, including its rugged terrain and temperature fluctuations. The LTV is expected to support missions starting with Artemis V, anticipated to launch no earlier than 2028.

== Canary ==
The environmental sensor Space Canary was developed for NASA's Gateway to detect harmful lunar dust and protect astronauts and equipment. The company is offering the rebranded Canary-S (Solar) as a ground-based air quality monitor that detects, analyzes, and reports on pollutants including methane, CO_{2}, CO, and others. Canary-S can be used for monitoring forest fire emissions, urban air pollution, and industrial leaks, providing real-time data on particulate matter. It is used by the oil and gas industry, the US Forest Service, and in urban applications.
