= Axiom Extravehicular Mobility Unit =

Lunar spacesuit developed by Axiom Space for Artemis program

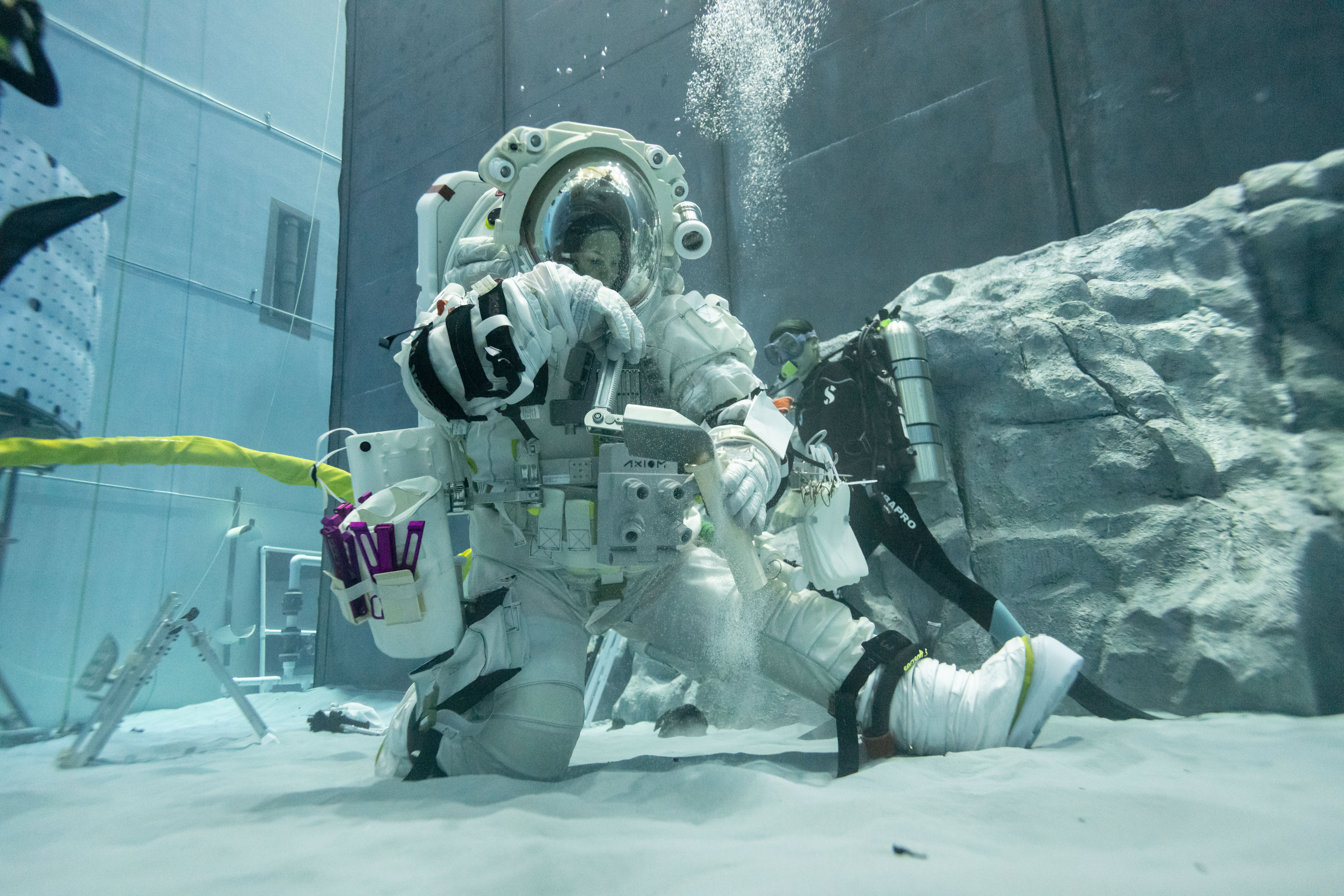
Canadian Space Agency astronaut Jenni Gibbons practicing lunar tasks while wearing AxEMU spacesuit

Axiom Extravehicular Mobility Unit (AxEMU) is a spacesuit being developed by Axiom Space for use on the NASA-led Artemis program missions to the Moon.

The suit is designed for astronaut activities on the lunar surface, providing life support, mobility, and environmental protection during extravehicular activity. It is intended to operate in the temperature, dust, and radiation conditions expected during Artemis missions.

== History ==
=== Design and development ===
AxEMU incorporates a modular architecture and updated components derived from NASA spacesuit development programs. According to Axiom Space, the design is intended to increase astronaut mobility and support maintenance and component replacement.

Axiom Space collaborated with Italian fashion house Prada on the exterior design of the suit and the associated Liquid Cooling and Ventilation Garment (LCVG), which is worn beneath the pressure garment assembly.

=== Ground testing ===
NASA began testing the AxEMU at the Neutral Buoyancy Laboratory at Johnson Space Center in 2025. In 2026, Axiom Space unveiled the LCVG, while testing of the garment and the suit's primary life-support system continued at Johnson Space Center.

=== Flight testing ===
NASA plans to conduct an in-space demonstration of the AxEMU aboard the International Space Station in 2027, where the suit could be used during a spacewalk. NASA also plans to fly an AxEMU on Artemis III, where astronauts are expected to conduct hardware interface evaluations with at least one commercial lunar lander.

=== Planned operational use ===
The suit is planned for use on future Artemis lunar missions. As of 2026, Artemis IV, planned for 2028, is expected to be the first Artemis mission to attempt a crewed lunar landing and the first mission to use the AxEMU on the lunar surface.
