= Lunar Terrain Vehicle =

Under development lunar rover

Lunar Terrain Vehicle (LTV)
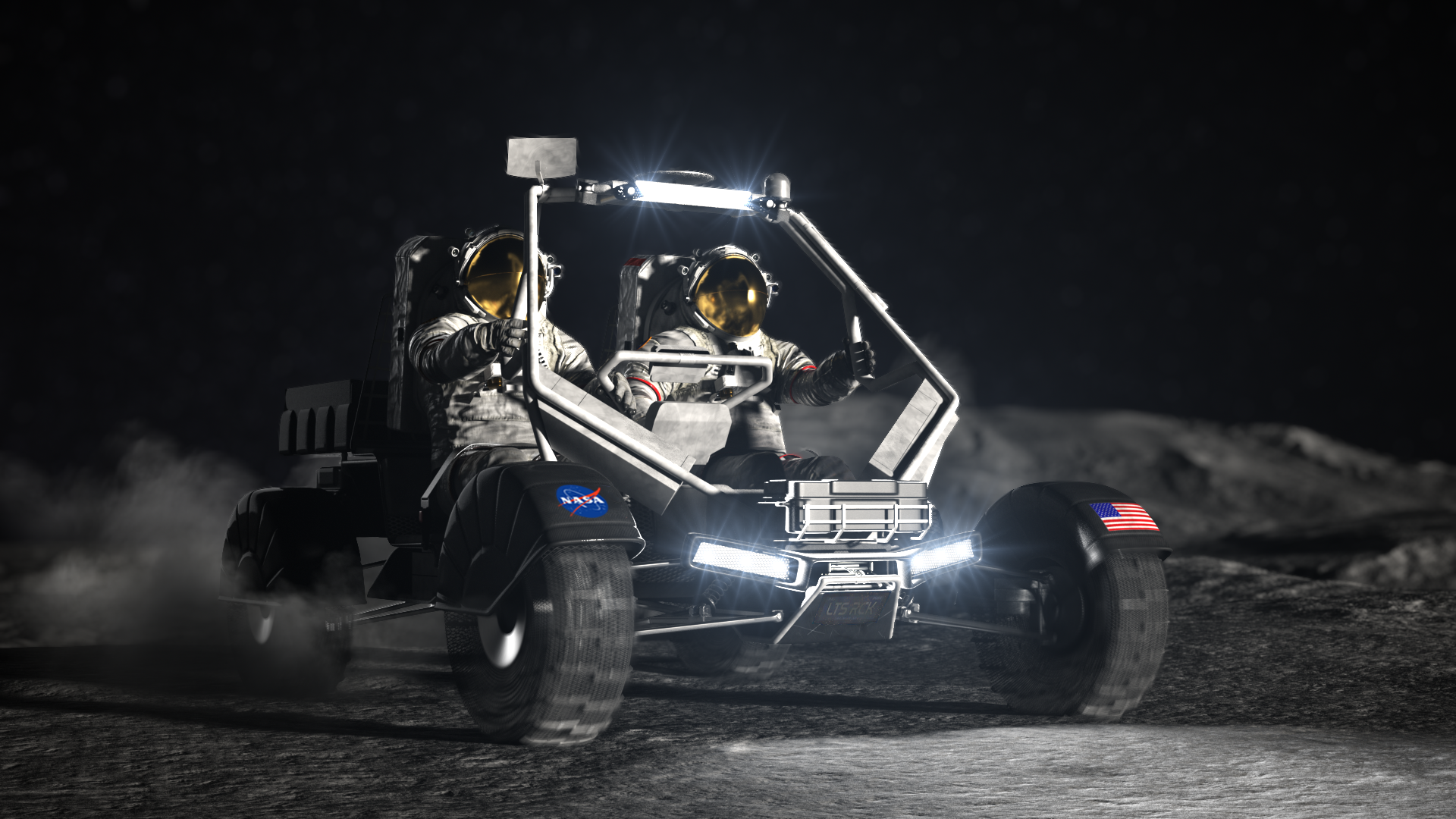
- Artist's impression the Lunar Terrain Vehicle on the lunar surface (2022)

Overview
- Manufacturer: TBD
- Production: 2029 (est.)
- Designer: Lunar Outpost, General Motors, Goodyear, Leidos, Astrolab, Axiom Space, Interlune, Odyssey Space Research

Chronology
- Predecessor: Lunar Rover Vehicle

The Lunar Terrain Vehicle (LTV) is an unpressurized rover being developed for NASA. Astronauts would be able to drive the LTV on the surface of the Moon while wearing space suits. The development of the LTV is a part of NASA's Artemis program, which involves returning astronauts to the Moon, specifically the lunar south pole. The LTV will be the first crewed lunar rover developed by NASA since the Lunar Roving Vehicle used during the Apollo program of the 1970s.

== History ==
On February 6, 2020, NASA issued a request, seeking industry feedback on relevant state-of-the-art commercial technologies and acquisition strategies for a new Lunar Terrain Vehicle. NASA also stated in the request that they want the LTV to draw on recent innovations in electric vehicle energy storage and management, autonomous driving, and extreme environment resistance."

On August 31, 2021, NASA released another request to private companies for additional input on approaches and solutions for a vehicle to transport Artemis astronauts around the lunar south pole. NASA also asked if American companies are interested in providing the LTV as a commercial service, or as a product NASA would purchase and own.

On November 2, 2022, NASA issued a draft request for proposals (RFP) for the LTV as a service (LTVS). The draft was open for feedback until December 1, with a planned final RFP release date of on or about February 8, 2023, a proposals due date approximately 30 days later, and an anticipated contract award date of on or about July 19.

On January 27, 2023, NASA published an update stating that it anticipated that the LTVS final RFP release would be delayed until no later than May 26. On May 26, NASA released its services request for the Lunar Terrain Vehicle, with proposals due on July 10 and a contract award scheduled for November. On October 30, NASA delayed the award of the contract to March 31, 2024, to allow additional time to evaluate proposals.

On April 3, 2024, NASA announced that Intuitive Machines, Lunar Outpost and Venturi Astrolab were the three companies developing the LTV as part of a 12-month feasibility and demonstration phase. A source selection statement by NASA provided further details on cost and overall feasibility on April 9. The Intuitive Machines proposal was for $1.692 billion, Lunar Outpost for $1.727 billion and Astrolab for $1.928 billion to develop the vehicle.

=== Initial proposals ===
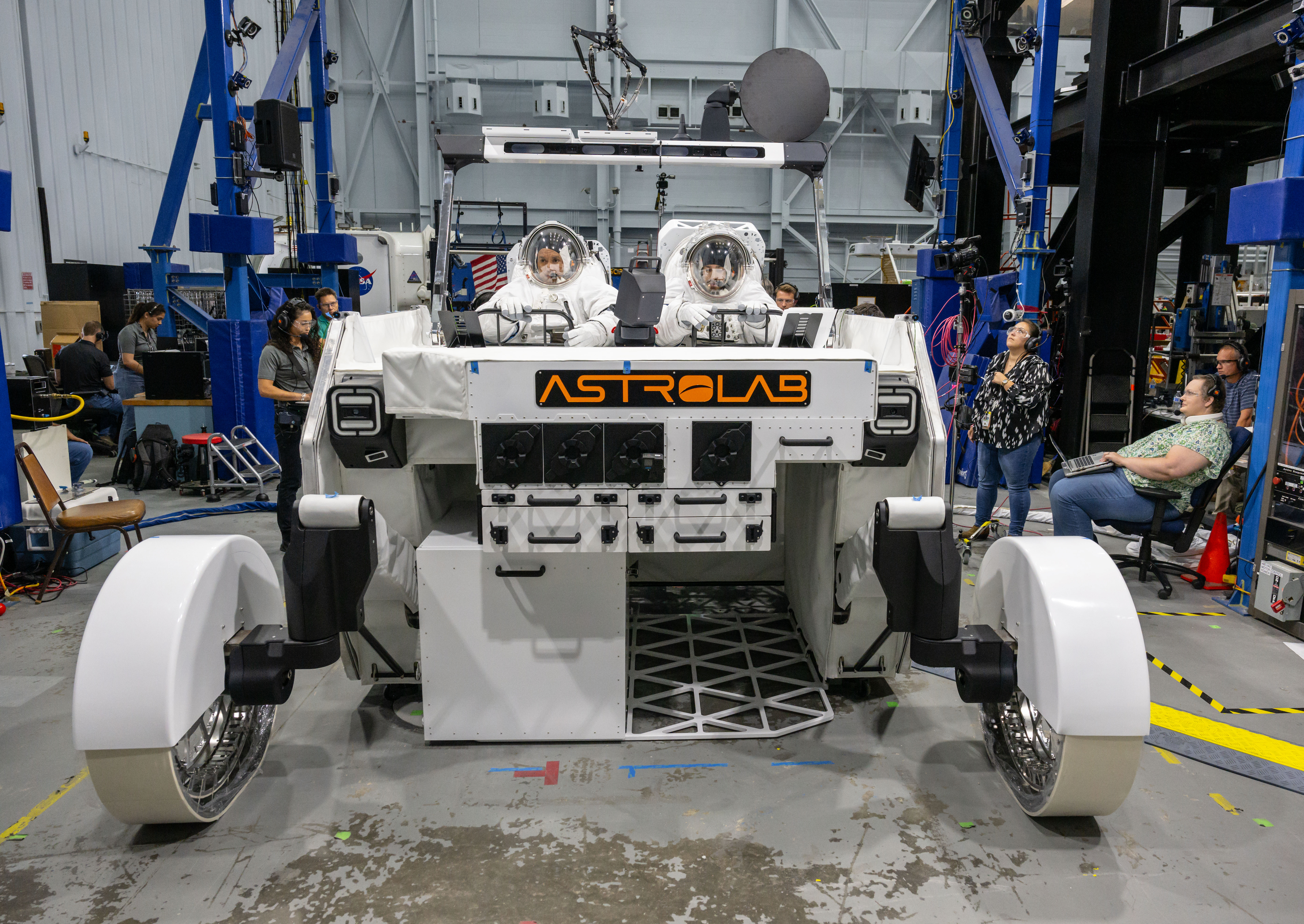
NASA astronaut Frank Rubio (left) and NASA spacesuit engineer Zach Tejral (right) sit inside Astrolab’s FLEX lunar terrain vehicle evaluating the display interfaces in 2024 during testing at NASA’s Johnson Space Center.

Five proposals for a Lunar Terrain Vehicle were publicly unveiled after NASA's initial request.

- On May 26, 2021, Lockheed Martin and General Motors announced they would together design an LTV. On April 5, 2022, MDA Ltd. announced they would work with Lockheed Martin and General Motors to integrate MDA's commercial robotic arm technology on their planned human-rated lunar mobility vehicles. On July 20, 2022, Goodyear announced they would join Lockheed Martin and General Motors to develop tires for the LTV drawing from its advanced airless tire technology.
- On November 16, 2021, Northrop Grumman announced they would work with AVL, Intuitive Machines, Lunar Outpost, and Michelin to design an LTV.
- On April 7, 2022, Teledyne Brown Engineering announced that it would lead a team including Sierra Space and Nissan North America to design a crewed LTV. On September 22, Teledyne announced that Bridgestone would also join its team and provide tires for the LTV.
- On March 31, 2023, Astrolab Incorporated announced that they expected to offer their FLEX (Flexible Logistics and Exploration) rover for the upcoming LTV competition.
- On April 17, 2023, Leidos and NASCAR announced they would collaborate in the areas of speed, safety and reliability to develop an LTV.

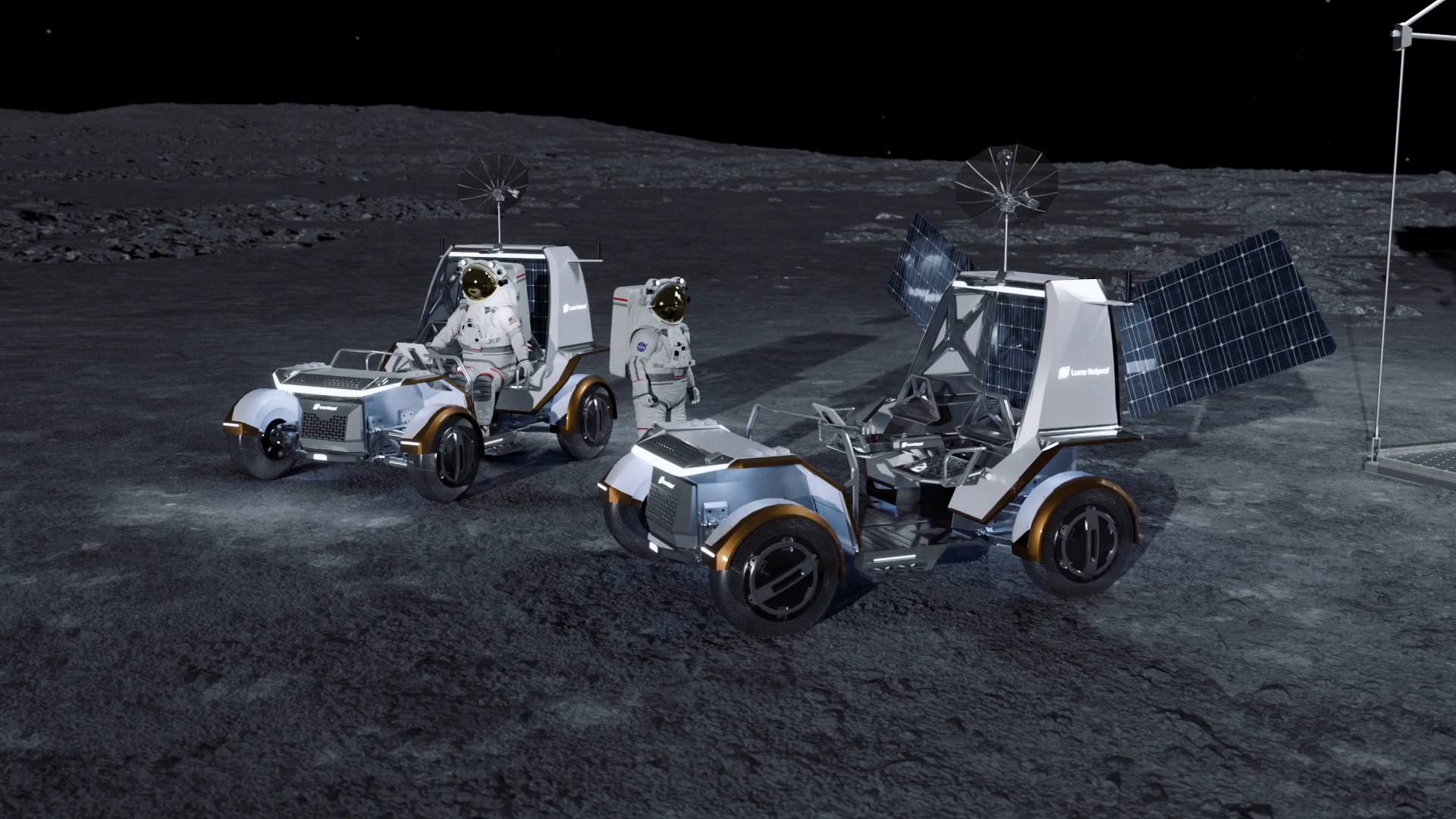
A 2026 artist's rendering of Lunar Outpost's Pegasus lunar terrain vehicle on the lunar surface.

=== Selected proposals ===
On May 26, 2026, NASA awarded two contracts for lunar rovers for crew to drive on the Moon. The selected proposals were:

- The Pegasus, which would be developed by a team led by Lunar Outpost in partnership with General Motors, Goodyear, and Leidos.
- The CLV-1, which would be developed by a team led by Astrolab together with its Axiom Space, Interlune and Odyssey Space Research.

== Plans ==
In 2023, NASA planned to launch the Lunar Terrain Vehicle on Artemis V, which at the time was expected to launch no earlier than March 2030.

== See also ==
- Space Exploration Vehicle, previous NASA concept for a multipurpose crewed rover
