= Executive Order 14369 =

2025 U.S. executive order on space policy

- Ensuring American Space Superiority
- Type: Executive order
- Number: 14369
- President: Donald Trump
- Signed: December 18, 2025

Summary
- This executive order establishes United States space policy priorities across civil exploration, national security, commercial space development, space nuclear power, and space traffic management.

Executive Order 14369, titled Ensuring American Space Superiority, is a presidential executive order signed by President Donald Trump on December 18, 2025. It establishes United States space policy across civil exploration, national security, commercial development, and space nuclear power.

The order revokes Executive Order 14056 and amends Space Policy Directive 3 to remove provisions requiring certain space situational awareness and traffic management services to be provided free of charge.

== Background ==
The order was one of several space-policy actions issued during Trump's second term. The first, signed in August 2025 and titled "Enabling Competition in the U.S. Commercial Space Industry," focused primarily on commercial space regulatory reform. The order reinforces NASA’s plans to return astronauts to the Moon by 2028, establish a lunar outpost by 2030, and develop nuclear power systems for use in space.

Executive Order 14369 addressed a broader range of civil, commercial, national-security, and space-infrastructure priorities.
