= Space policy of the first Trump administration =

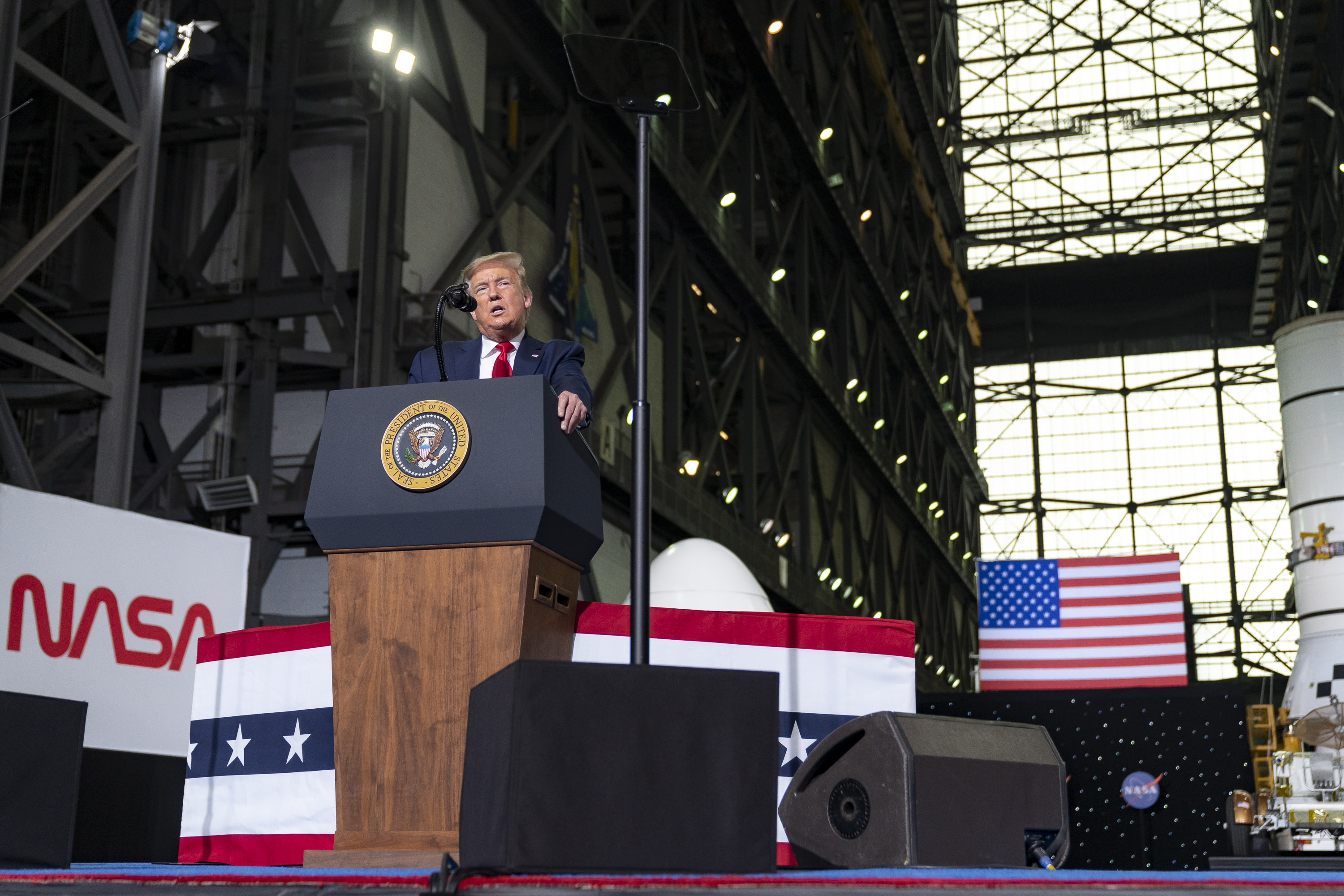
Trump speaking during Crew Dragon Demo-2 launch event, May 2020

The space policy of the first Donald Trump administration comprises six Space Policy Directives and an announced "National Space Strategy" (issued March 28, 2018), representing a directional shift from the policy priorities and goals of his predecessor, Barack Obama. A National Space Policy was issued on December 9, 2020.

== History ==
=== 2017: Space Policy Directive-1 ===
On December 11, 2017, President Donald Trump issued a presidential memorandum also known as "Space Policy Directive-1". This directive amended Barack Obama's "Presidential Policy Directive 4," by replacing the paragraph beginning “Set far-reaching exploration milestones...” with the paragraph “Lead an innovative and sustainable program of exploration with commercial and international partners to enable human expansion across the Solar System and to bring back to Earth new knowledge and opportunities. Beginning with missions beyond low-Earth orbit, the United States will lead the return of humans to the Moon for long-term exploration and utilization, followed by human missions to Mars and other destinations.”

=== 2018: Space Policy Directive-2 ===
On May 24, 2018, Donald Trump issued Space Policy Directive-2, "Streamlining Regulations on Commercial Use of Space," which begins "Section 1. Policy. It is the policy of the executive branch to be prudent and responsible when spending taxpayer funds, and to recognize how government actions, including Federal regulations, affect private resources. It is therefore important that regulations adopted and enforced by the executive branch promote economic growth; minimize uncertainty for taxpayers, investors, and private industry; protect national security, public-safety, and foreign policy interests; and encourage American leadership in space commerce."

The subsequent sections direct changes to existing policy as follows:

- Section 2 requires the Department of Transportation to, by February 1, 2019, review its licensing procedures and regulations for launch and re-entry of commercial space vehicles and "rescind or revise those regulations, or publish for notice and comment proposed rules rescinding or revising" them. It also directs the Secretary of Transportation to consider a single blanket license for commercial spaceflight, and to consider "replacing prescriptive requirements in the commercial space flight launch and re-entry licensing process with performance-based criteria," in coordination with the National Space Council.
- In Section 2(c), the Secretary of Defense and the NASA Administrator are also directed to examine regulatory requirements for commercial spaceflight launches and re-entry operations from federal government ranges and "to minimize those requirements, except those necessary to protect public safety and national security," to assist the Secretary of Transportation in implementing the directive. In Sec. 2(c), the Secretary of Commerce is directed to rescind or revise regulations pertaining to remote sensing satellites that might impede the goals of Section 1, and to coordinate with the aforementioned officials as well as the Secretary of State and, as appropriate, the Chairman of the Federal Communications Commission.

=== 2018: Space Policy Directive-3 ===
On June 18, 2018, Donald Trump issued Space Policy Directive-3 (SPD-3), "National Space Traffic Management Policy." Section 6 conveys the actual responsibilities generated by the directives in the preceding sections, instructing the members of the National Space Council to come up with plans, and directing the Administrator of the National Aeronautics and Space Administration (NASA Administrator), the Secretaries of State, Defense, Commerce, and Transportation, the Director of National Intelligence, and the Chairman of the Federal Communications Commission (FCC) to implement Space Situational Awareness (SSA), Space Traffic Management (STM), and development of appropriate Science & Technology research to support expansion and interoperability (internationally and between various parties domestically) of SSA and STM systems. Preserving the space environment for safe operations is in every nation's best interests, so the policy leads in the direction of cooperation on collision avoidance, orbital debris mitigation, etc. This reiterates concerns raised in the 2010 National Space Policy, but expands with directives to various agencies who are stakeholders, and includes the recently re-formed National Space Council.

=== 2018: Space Policy Directive-4 and Space Force ===
On October 23, 2018, the White House issued a press release detailing the recommendations that would be addressed in Space Policy Directive-4 (SPD-4). These are centered on the formation of a Space Force, and follow the guidelines of Donald Trump's June 18, 2018 directive to the Department of Defense to immediately begin the process necessary to establish Space Force as a separate military branch.

The six recommendations are:

- Forming a United States Space Command to control our space forces and develop the tactics, techniques, and procedures for military space operations.
- Establishing the Space Force as a separate and distinct branch of the military whose mission will be to organize, train, and equip combat space forces.
- Calling on Congress to authorize the establishment of a Space Force and provide funding for the United States Space Command.
- Launching a joint review by the National Space Council and National Security Council of existing space operational authorities for meeting national security objectives, informed by DOD's assessment of the authorities required.
- Creating a Space Development Agency to ensure Americans in the Space Force have cutting-edge warfighting capabilities.
- Creating collaborative mechanisms with the Intelligence Community to improve unity of efforts for the development of space capabilities and operations.

During the 2019 State of the Union Address, Donald Trump said: "This year, American astronauts will go back to space in American rockets," referring to SpaceX's Crew Dragon, which was launched on May 30, 2020, to be the first crewed orbital spaceflight launched from the United States since 2011.

=== 2020: Space Policy Directive-5 ===
In September 2020, the White House issued Space Policy Directive-5 (SPD-5), Cybersecurity Principles for Space Systems. SPD-5 established the cybersecurity principles to guide and serve as the foundation for the U.S. approach to the cyber protection of the U.S. government's space systems and private space systems.

=== 2020: Executive Order 13959 ===
In November 2020, U.S. President Donald Trump issued an executive order prohibiting U.S. companies and individuals owning shares in companies that the United States Department of Defense has listed as having links to the People's Liberation Army, which includes the aerospace industry of China.

=== 2020: National Space Policy ===
On December 9, 2020, the White House issued a National Space Policy. This policy advocates for expanding U.S. leadership in space, allowing unfettered access to space, encouraging private sector growth, expanding international cooperation, and establishing a human presence on the Moon with an eventual human mission to Mars.

=== 2020: Space Policy Directive-6 ===
On December 16, 2020, the White House issued Space Policy Directive-6 (SPD-6), the National Strategy for Space Nuclear Power and Propulsion. It laid out a national strategy for the responsible and effective development and use of space nuclear power and propulsion systems. An early project developed from this directive was the Demonstration Rocket for Agile Cislunar Operations (DRACO), which was scrapped in 2025 due to decreasing launch costs and new analysis.

== Space Force ==
In March 2018, President Donald Trump said that the creation of a Space Force was a "great idea" and "could happen". In June 2018, Trump said that he had asked the Department of Defense to begin establishing a Space Force as part of the military. In February 2019, the Department of Defense gave Congress a legislative proposal for creating the Space Force. This proposal called for the placement of the U.S. Space Force within the Department of the Air Force, before later creating and transferring the service to the Department of the Space Force.

On 20 December 2019, President Donald Trump signed the National Defense Authorization Act for Fiscal Year 2020 into law, which included legislative provisions for creation of the Space Force, under the United States Space Force Act. The Space Force was established as the sixth armed service branch, with Air Force General John "Jay" Raymond, the commander of Air Force Space Command and U.S. Space Command, becoming the first chief of space operations.

== See also ==
- Space policy of the second Trump administration
- Space policy of the United States
- United States Space Force

| Preceded by Space policy of the Barack Obama administration | Space policy of the United States; 2017–2021 | Succeeded by Space policy of the Joe Biden administration |
