= Artemis V =

Fifth orbital flight of the Artemis program

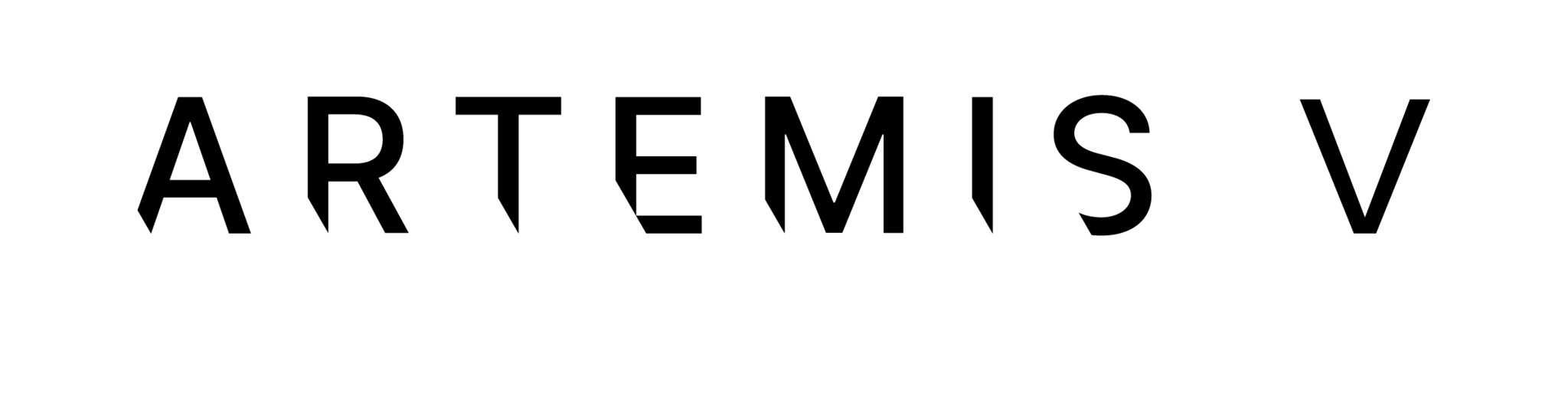
- The logo of Artemis V
- Mission type: Crewed lunar landing
- Operator: NASA
- Website: nasa.gov/mission/artemis-v

Spacecraft properties
- Spacecraft: Orion CM-005; ESM-5; Blue Moon HLS or Starship HLS
- Manufacturer: Orion CM: Lockheed Martin; ESM: Airbus Defence and Space; HLS: Blue Origin or SpaceX

Start of mission
- Launch date: Late 2028 (planned)
- Rocket: Space Launch System
- Launch site: Kennedy, LC-39B

End of mission
- Landing site: Pacific Ocean (planned)

Moon lander
- Landing site: South polar region

Artemis V is planned to be the fourth crewed mission and second lunar landing of the NASA-led Artemis program. The mission is expected to see the first efforts by NASA to begin building a permanent Moon base. As of March 2026, launch is scheduled for late 2028.

Originally, Artemis V was proposed as the program's third lunar landing mission, sending an Orion spacecraft with four astronauts to the now-cancelled Lunar Gateway space station, where they would install two elements before heading to the lunar surface.

== Original overview ==
Originally, Artemis V was scheduled to launch four astronauts to the cancelled Lunar Gateway space station. The mission would have delivered the European Space Agency's ESPRIT refueling and communications module and a Canadian-built robotic arm system for the Gateway, Canadarm3. NASA's Lunar Terrain Vehicle would also have been delivered.

Original Artemis V lander mission plan

Two astronauts will board the Blue Moon lunar lander and fly it down to the lunar south pole to land near the Lunar Terrain Vehicle. This will be the first lunar landing since Apollo 17 to use an unpressurized lunar rover. It is planned to have the two astronauts on the surface of the Moon for about one week where they will conduct science and exploration activities.

Prior to February 2026, Artemis V was scheduled to launch no earlier than March 2030.

=== Gateway ===
Gateway is a small modular space station that was planned to be established in Near-rectilinear halo orbit (NRHO) in December 2027, but was cancelled in early 2026, being remade into the project of a lunar surface base.

== Spacecraft ==
=== Space Launch System ===
The Space Launch System is a super-heavy-lift launcher used to launch the Orion spacecraft from Earth to a trans-lunar orbit.

This will be the first mission to use the standardized configuration of the SLS, with a Centaur V upper stage in place of the Interim Cryogenic Propulsion Stage (ICPS) flown on the previous SLS launches.

=== Orion ===
Orion is the crew transport vehicle used by all Artemis missions. It will transport the crew from Earth to the Moon, to create a lunar base, and return them to Earth.

=== Blue Origin's Blue Moon lander ===
The Blue Moon lander planned to transfer astronauts from the now-cancelled Gateway to the lunar surface and back. Blue Origin will be the second provider to deliver Artemis astronauts to the lunar surface. NASA previously contracted SpaceX to develop and demonstrate the Starship Human Landing System.

Blue Origin will design, develop, test, and verify its Blue Moon lander to meet NASA's human landing system requirements for recurring astronaut expeditions to the lunar surface. In addition to design and development work, the contract includes one uncrewed demonstration mission to the lunar surface and the crewed demo in 2030. The total award value of the contract is $3.4 billion.

=== Lunar Terrain Vehicle ===
The Lunar Terrain Vehicle is an unenclosed rover being developed by NASA that astronauts will drive on the Moon while wearing spacesuits.

== See also ==
- List of Artemis missions
- List of missions to the Moon
