= Pratt & Whitney Rocketdyne =

Former American company that designed and produced rocket engines

- Type: Division
- Industry: Aerospace
- Predecessor: Pratt & Whitney Space Propulsion; Boeing Rocketdyne
- Founded: 2005; 21 years ago
- Defunct: 2013
- Fate: Acquired
- Successor: Aerojet Rocketdyne
- Headquarters: Canoga Park, California, U.S.
- Products: Rocket engines
- Parent: United Technologies Corporation

Pratt & Whitney Rocketdyne (PWR) was an American company that designed and produced rocket engines that use liquid propellants. It was a division of Pratt & Whitney, a fully owned subsidiary of United Technologies Corporation. It was headquartered in Canoga Park, Los Angeles, California. In 2013, the company was sold to GenCorp, Inc., becoming part of Aerojet Rocketdyne.

== History ==
Pratt & Whitney Rocketdyne was formed in 2005 when Pratt & Whitney Space Propulsion and Boeing Rocketdyne Propulsion & Power were merged, following the latter's acquisition from Boeing by United Technologies Corporation. Boeing retained the 2,800 acre Rocketdyne Santa Susana Field Laboratory property above Canoga Park while a majority of the engineering and design continued to be carried out at the Pratt & Whitney Space Propulsion facility located on Beeline Highway outside West Palm Beach, Florida.

In July 2012, United Technologies Corporation agreed to sell Pratt & Whitney Rocketdyne to GenCorp, Inc., which also owns rocket engine producer Aerojet. The sale was completed in June 2013, when the company was merged with Aerojet to form Aerojet Rocketdyne.

== Products ==
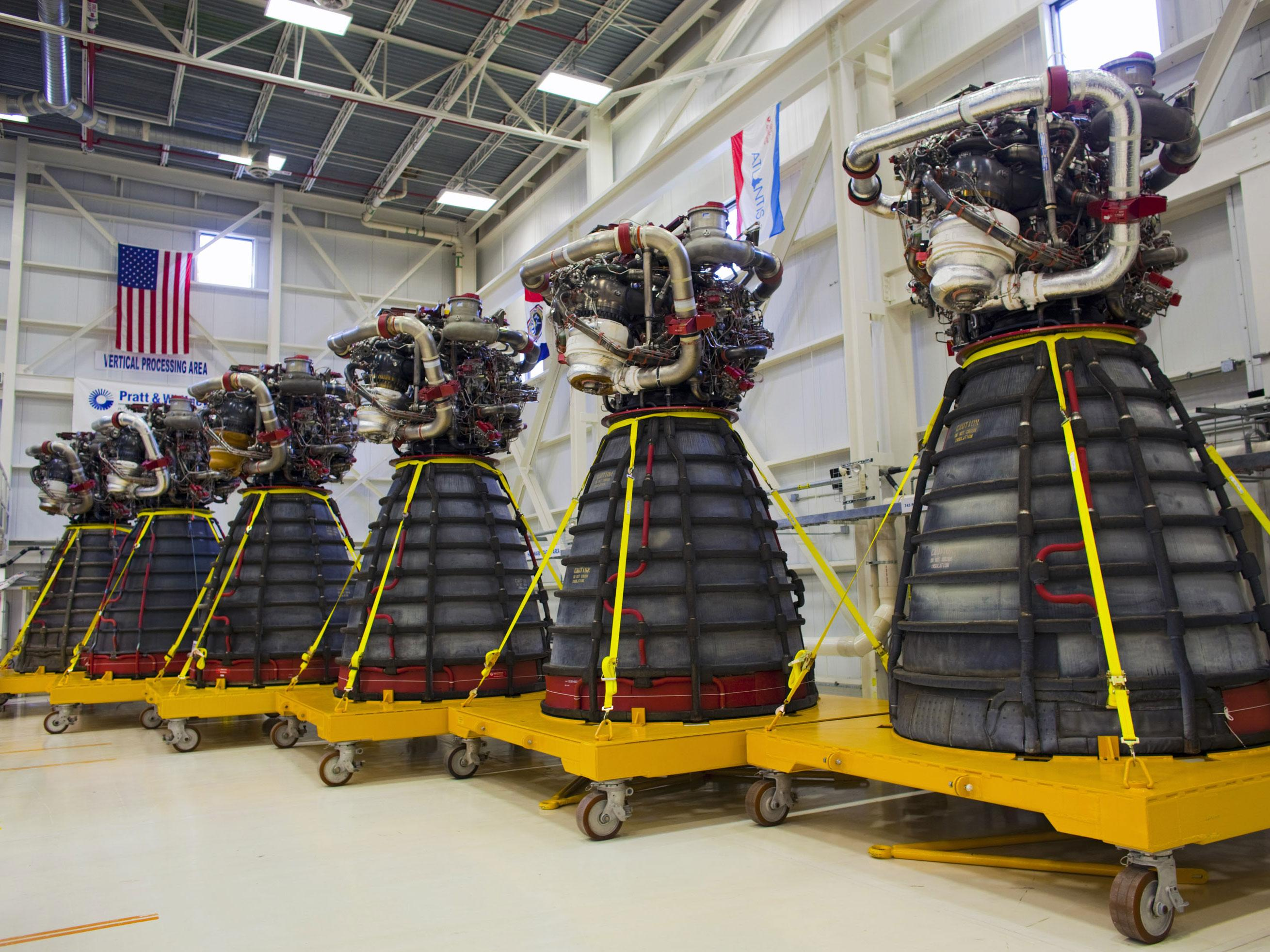
RS-25 Space Shuttle Main Engines

Pratt & Whitney Rocketdyne

- RL10 (LH2/LOX) An American Society of Mechanical Engineers (ASME) Historic Landmark developed by Pratt & Whitney. Used on the Saturn I, the upper stage of the Delta IV, the Centaur upper stage for the Atlas and Titan rockets and on the vertical-landing McDonnell Douglas DC-X "Delta Clipper". It was intended to serve as the main propulsion engine for the Altair lunar lander. Currently in use on the Atlas V, Vulcan Centaur, Space Launch System Block 1, and in the future, Space Launch System Block 1B and Block 2. (Centaur III, Centaur V, Interim Cryogenic Propulsion System, and Exploration Upper Stage respectively.
- RS-68 (LH2/LOX) First stage engine for the Delta IV.
- RS-25 (LH2/LOX) Space Shuttle main engine and also used on the SLS core stage.
- SJ61 (JP-7/ingested air) A dual-mode ramjet/scramjet engine flown on the Boeing X-51 hypersonic demonstration vehicle.
- J-2X (LH2/LOX) Previously developed to be used on the Earth Departure Stage for the Block II of the Space Launch System, though the EDS was later replaced by the Exploration Upper Stage using 4 RL10 engines.

== See also ==
- Rocketdyne
- Rocketdyne engines
- Commercial Spaceflight Federation
- Santa Susana Field Laboratory
