= Ares V =

Canceled NASA rocket key to Project Constellation

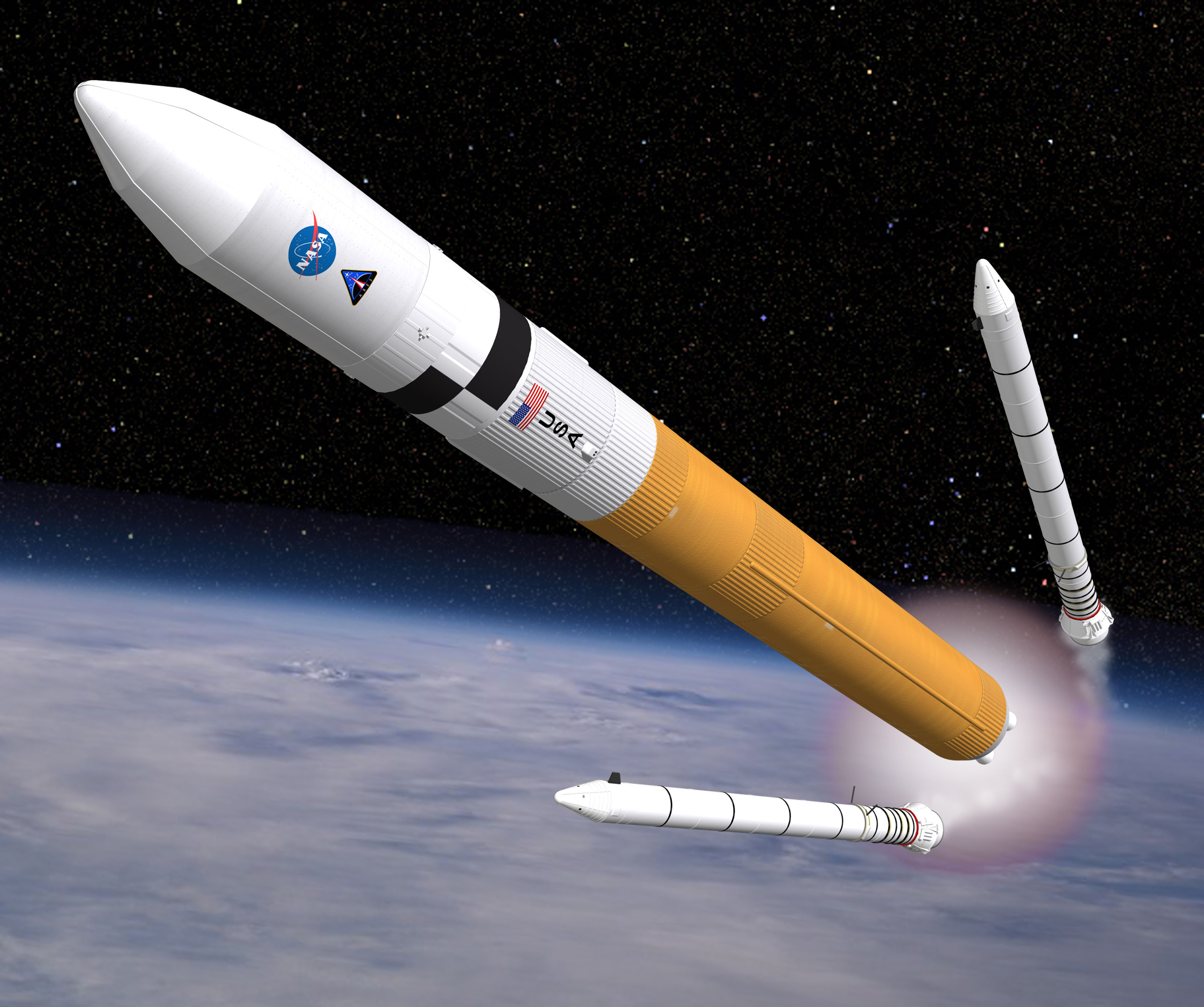
- Artist's impression of an Ares V during solid rocket booster separation
- Function: Super heavy-lift launch vehicle
- Country of origin: United States

Size
- Height: 109 or 116 m (358 or 381 ft)
- Diameter: 8.4 or 10 m (28 or 33 ft)
- Mass: 3,700,000 kilograms (8,200,000 lb)
- Stages: 2

Capacity

Payload to LEO
- Mass: 188,000 kg (414,000 lb)

Payload to TLI
- Mass: 60,600 or 71,100 kg (133,600 or 156,700 lb)

Launch history
- Status: Canceled
- Launch sites: Kennedy, LC-39A (planned)
- Total launches: 0

Boosters – five-segment SRB
- No. boosters: 2
- Height: 54 m (177 ft)
- Diameter: 3.7 m (12 ft)
- Gross mass: 730,000 kg (1,600,000 lb)
- Maximum thrust: SL: 14.6 MN (3,280,000 lbf); vac: 16 MN (3,600,000 lbf)
- Total thrust: SL: 29.2 MN (6,560,000 lbf); vac: 32 MN (7,200,000 lbf)
- Specific impulse: 269 s (2.64 km/s)
- Burn time: 126 seconds
- Propellant: APCP (Al / AP / PBAN)

First stage
- Empty mass: 140,000 kg (310,000 lb)
- Gross mass: 1,914,000 kg (4,220,000 lb)
- Powered by: 5 × RS-25 or; 5 × RS-68B or; 6 × RS-68B
- Maximum thrust: 5 × RS-68: 15,685 kN (3,526,000 lb_{f}); 6 × RS-68: 18,822 kN (4,231,000 lb_{f}); 5 × RS-25: 11,395 kN (2,562,000 lb_{f})
- Propellant: LH_{2} / LOX

Second stage – Earth Departure Stage
- Powered by: 1 or 2 × J-2X
- Propellant: LH_{2} / LOX

The Ares V (formerly known as the Cargo Launch Vehicle or CaLV) was the planned cargo launch component of the cancelled NASA Constellation program, which was to have replaced the Space Shuttle after its retirement in 2011. Ares V was also intended to carry supplies for a human presence on Mars. Ares V and the smaller Ares I were named after Ares, the Greek god of war.

The Ares V was to launch the Earth Departure Stage and Altair lunar lander for NASA's return to the Moon, which was planned for 2019. It would also have served as the principal launcher for missions beyond the Earth-Moon system, including the program's ultimate goal, a crewed mission to Mars. The uncrewed Ares V would complement the smaller and human-rated Ares I rocket for the launching of the 4–6 person Orion spacecraft. Both rockets, deemed safer than the then-current Space Shuttle, would have employed technologies developed for the Apollo program, the Shuttle program, and the Delta IV EELV program. However, the Constellation program, including Ares V and Ares I, was canceled in October 2010 by the NASA Authorization Act of 2010. In September 2011, NASA detailed the Space Launch System as its new vehicle for human exploration beyond Earth's orbit, while commercial space companies would provide low Earth orbit access for both cargo and astronauts.

== Development ==
=== Early concepts ===
In the 1996 book The Case for Mars, author Robert Zubrin discussed a possible future heavy launch vehicle named Ares. In the book, the rocket would have consisted of the Space Shuttle external tank powered by four Space Shuttle Main Engines (SSMEs) and a second stage powered by an RL10 engine. One notable difference in the Zubrin et al. design is that the SSMEs were on a small side-mounted flyback craft. This design was meant to allow the Ares to fly using existing Space Shuttle infrastructure.

=== Constellation ===
Ares V was to be the cargo launch component of the Constellation program. Unlike the Saturn V and Space Shuttle, where the crew and cargo were launched together on the same rocket, Project Constellation planned to use two separate launch vehicles, the Ares I and the Ares V, for crew and cargo respectively. This configuration would have allowed the two launch vehicles to be optimized for their respective missions. Constellation therefore combined the Lunar Orbit Rendezvous used by Apollo with the Earth Orbit Rendezvous mode proposed by Dr. Wernher von Braun (alongside the "Direct Ascent" proposal) during the early planning stages of Apollo.

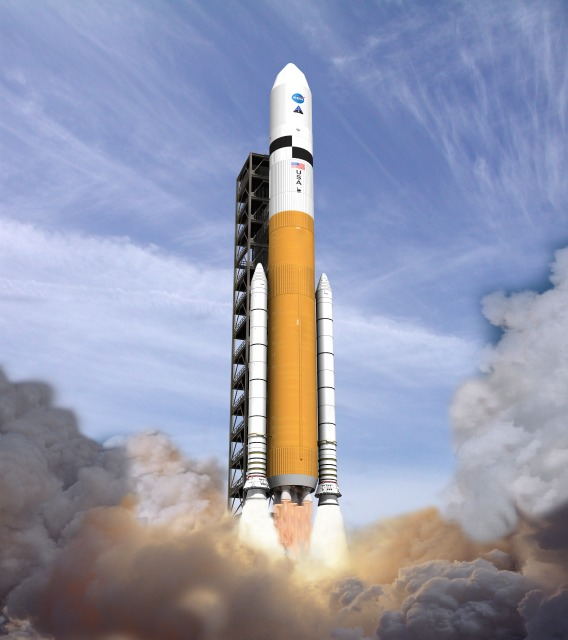
Artist's impression of the Ares V at liftoff

Development of the rocket and its Earth departure stage was led by NASA's Marshall Space Flight Center. NASA's Ames Research Center was responsible for the Ares V integrated health management system and for developing its payload shroud. Glenn Research Center led the development of the lunar lander ascent stage as well as Ares V power system, thrust vector control system and payload shroud. Langley Research Center had a lead role in researching Ares V aerodynamics.

In 2007, NASA announced that Alliant Techsystems would be the contractor for the SRBs of both Ares I and Ares V.

=== Further roles ===
Although the Ares V was a medium- to long-term project, NASA planned to deploy its lift capability in a range of projects, along the lines of the former Apollo Applications Program.

One proposal was to build an 8- to 16-meter Advanced Technology Large-Aperture Space Telescope to be placed in the Sun/Earth L2 point. It would be a significant increase in dimension and performance over the Hubble Space Telescope and the Ares V vehicle was expected to carry this to its destination in a single launch. Future Ares V missions could also have served as a cost-effective, mass transport of construction materials for future spacecraft and missions, delivering raw materials, for example, to a Moon dock.

In May 2010, NASA planned flight demonstrations of Ares V hardware along with Ares I hardware after the scheduled upcoming Ares I-X Prime test of the Ares I five-segment SRB first stage. Several flights were listed as "Heavy Lift" test flights for testing the first stage of the Ares V simultaneously with the Ares I upper stage attached on top of the Ares V first stage. This would save both time and money in avoiding the gap between testing Ares I and Ares V hardware with limited funding.

=== Cancellation ===
The Augustine Commission concluded that "under the FY 2010 funding profile, the Committee estimates that Ares V will not be available until the late 2020s". Even if NASA had been given a $3 billion increase in funding and the ISS had been retired in 2015, the committee still believed that the Ares V would not be ready until the mid-2020s.

On February 1, 2010, President Barack Obama announced a proposal to cancel the Constellation program effective with the U.S. 2011 fiscal year budget, but later announced changes to the proposal in a major space policy speech at Kennedy Space Center on April 15, 2010. In October 2010, the NASA Authorization Act of 2010 was signed into law, which canceled Constellation. However, previous legislation kept Constellation contracts in force until a new funding bill was passed for 2011. Due to previous legislative obligations, $500 million was to be paid to contractors after the program's cancellation until March 2011.

=== Successor ===
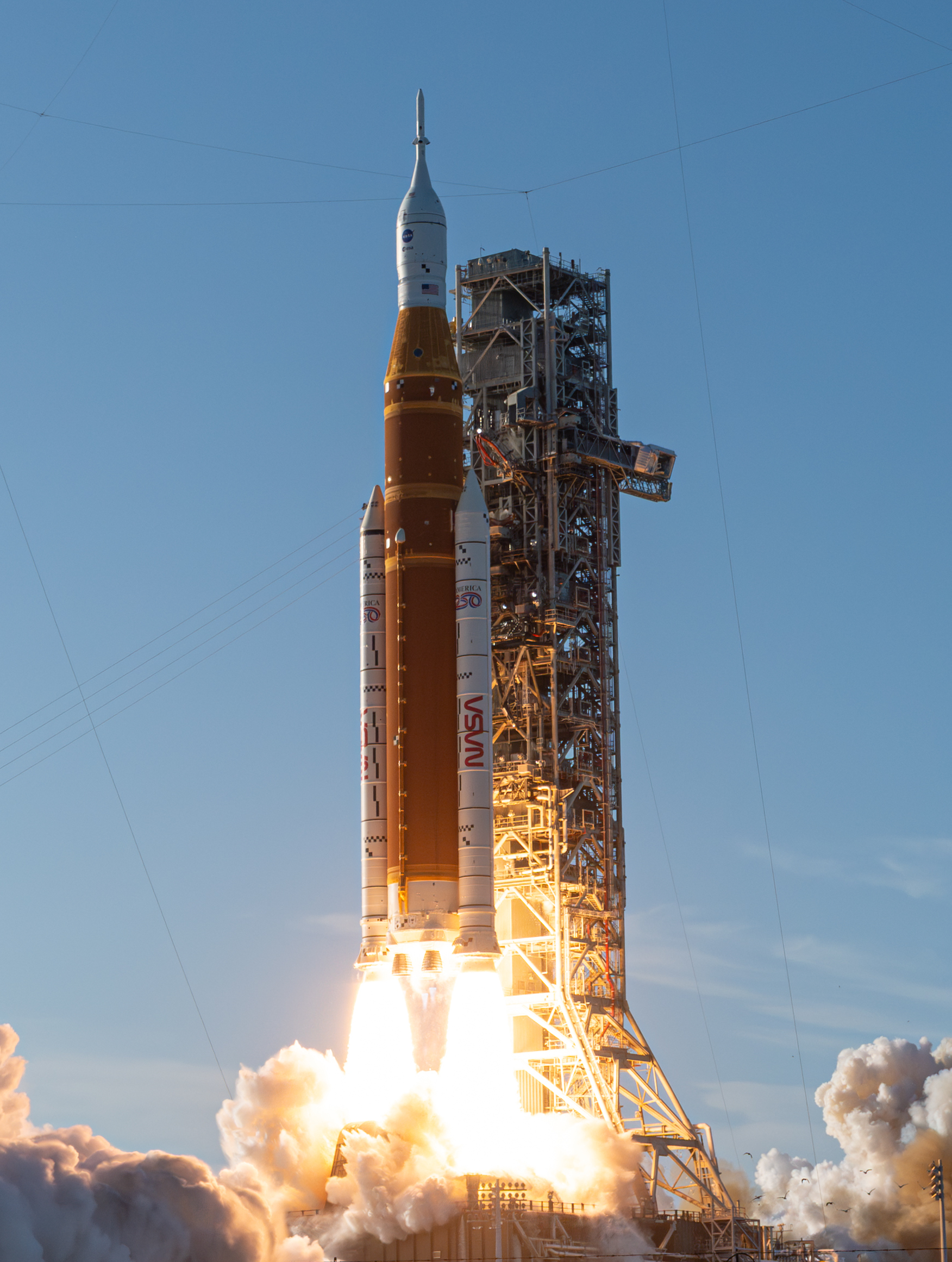
The smaller and less powerful Space Launch System is chosen to be the main workhorse for the Artemis program.

The successor to the Ares rocket family is the Space Launch System, a more versatile vehicle designed to launch both crew and cargo, similar to the Ares IV concept. It has a payload range of 95-130 tons to LEO across its different variants. The SLS is similar to earlier Ares V designs in that it uses a stretched 8.4–meter external tank and is powered by 4 RS-25s. Initial designs for the SLS used the same Earth Departure Stage but development was put on hold with the 4-RL10 Exploration Upper Stage taking its place. Both vehicles make use of the same 5–segment SRBs, although the SLS will not recover them. Under the Artemis program, the vehicle will transport crew to the Moon in the Orion spacecraft as well as logistics equipment and cargo for surface missions. They will rendezvous with a separate lunar lander either docked to the Lunar Gateway, a lunar orbital station, or free flying in lunar orbit. The SLS Block 1B version is capable of Earth orbital rendezvous lunar mission profiles such as that of the Ares V, lunar orbital rendezvous such as what NASA is currently pursuing, and integrated lunar missions such as the Apollo missions using the Saturn V, which has been proposed under a new House of Representatives bill.

== Design ==
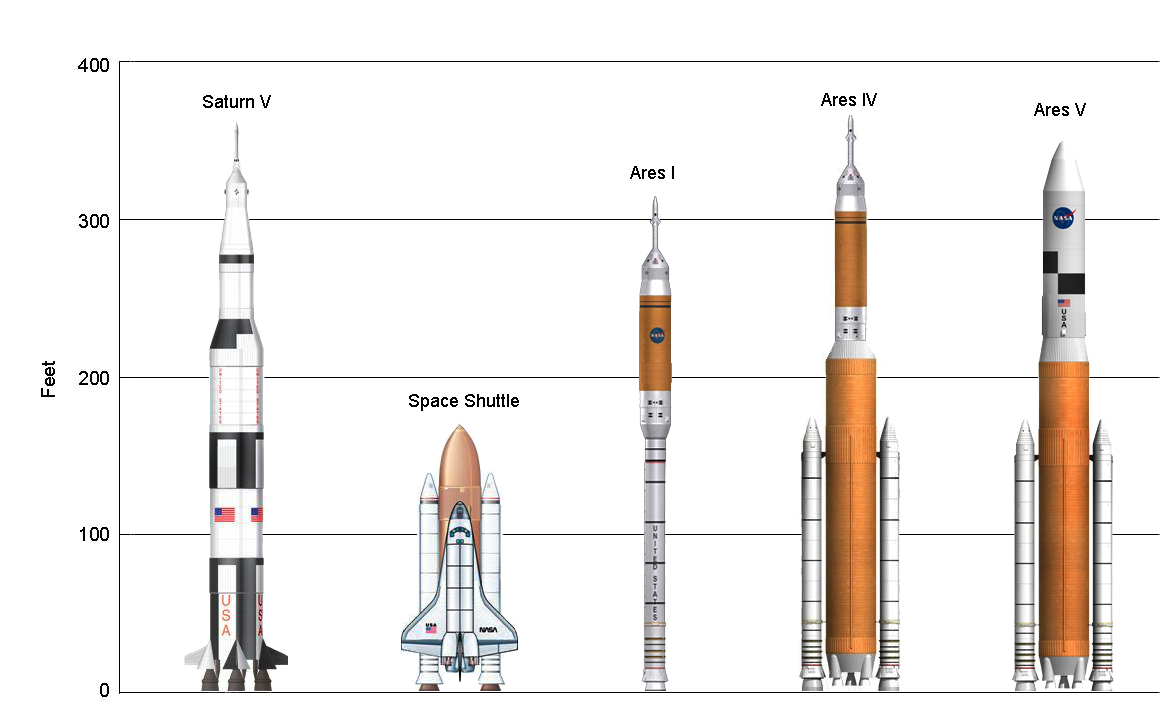
Comparison of Saturn V, Space Shuttle, Ares I, Ares IV and Ares V

The Ares V was intended as a heavy launch vehicle to send large hardware and materials to the Moon, or to send supplies beyond Earth orbit to sustain human presence there. The Ares V was designed to be a three-stage rocket: the first and second stages, which burn together, were to use both solid and liquid propulsion with the upper stage providing the necessary propulsion to send the hardware and staples beyond low Earth orbit and onto a trajectory to the Moon.

Ares V underwent a preliminary design review after the results of the 2009 Augustine Commission. Like the Space Shuttle, the Ares vehicle was to use a pair of solid-fuel first-stage rocket boosters that burn simultaneously with the liquid-fueled core stage. The solid rocket booster on Ares V was first envisioned as an improved version of the Space Shuttle Solid Rocket Booster, but with five or five and a half segments instead of the four segments used with the Space Shuttle. The liquid-fueled core stage was to be derived from the Space Shuttle external tank and was to use either five or six RS-68B engines attached to the bottom of a new 10 m diameter tank, or five SSMEs attached to the bottom of a stretched version of the Space Shuttle's 8.4 m external tank. It was to be fueled by liquid oxygen (LOX) and liquid hydrogen (LH2).

The upper stage, derived from the S-IVB upper stage used on the Saturn IB and Saturn V rockets, was named the Earth Departure Stage (EDS). The EDS would be powered by an Apollo-derived J-2X rocket engine, which was also to be used on the liquid-fueled upper stage of the Ares I booster. The EDS was to be used to steer the Altair lunar lander into its initial low Earth "parking" orbit for later retrieval by the Orion spacecraft, and then would propel both the Altair and Orion to the Moon. The EDS could also have been used to take large payloads into low Earth orbit, along with placing large uncrewed spacecraft onto trajectories beyond the Earth-Moon system.

The Ares V was designed to have a payload capacity of over 414,000 lb (188 metric tons) to Low Earth orbit (LEO), and 157,000 lb (71 metric tons) to the Moon. Upon completion the Ares V would be the most powerful rocket ever built, lifting more into orbit than even the American Saturn V, the failed Soviet N-1 for the canceled Soviet Moonshot, and the successful Soviet/Russian Energia booster developed for the Buran Shuttle. Besides its lunar role, it could also support a crewed Orion expedition to a Near-Earth asteroid, and could boost an 8 to 16-meter successor of the Hubble Space Telescope to the Sun-Earth L_{2} point.

== Derivatives ==
=== Ares IV ===
The Ares IV concept combines an Ares I upper stage on top of an Ares V. Specifically, the vehicle would consist of the liquid-fueled core stage from the Ares V design, two five-segment solid rocket boosters, and the liquid-fueled upper stage from the Ares I, as described by NASA in January 2007. The Ares IV would be a combined 367 ft (112 m) tall and could be used to reach the Moon. Total payload capacity would be 90,420 lb (41,000 kg) to 240 miles (390 km) for direct trans-lunar injection.

NASA had considered using Ares IV to evaluate high-speed "skip" reentry profiles of the Orion capsule in 2007. NASA had planned flight demonstrations of Ares I and Ares V hardware in "Heavy Lift" configurations beginning in 2013. The "Heavy Lift" test flights were to test the first stage of the Ares V simultaneously with the Ares I upper stage attached on top to save both time and money. The later Heavy Lift test vehicle configurations are similar to the Ares IV vehicle.

=== Ares V Lite ===
Ares V Lite was an alternative launch vehicle for NASA's Constellation program suggested by the Augustine Commission. Ares V Lite was a scaled down Ares V. It would have used five RS-68 engines and two five-segment SRBs and have had a low Earth orbit payload of approximately 140 metric tons (309,000 lb). If chosen, Ares V Lite would have replaced the Ares V and Ares I launchers. One Ares V Lite version would have been a cargo lifter like Ares V and the second version would have carried astronauts in the Orion spacecraft.

== In fiction ==
The Japanese manga Space Brothers depicts the Ares V rocket being used to launch missions to the Moon.

In the 2013 film Star Trek Into Darkness, a desktop model of the Ares V rocket was set decoration in the office of Admiral Alexander Marcus as part of his spaceflight collection.

== See also ==
- Comparison of orbital launch systems
- Space Launch System successor to Ares, similar in design.
- DIRECT launch vehicle
- Shuttle-Derived Heavy Lift Launch Vehicle
- Magnum (rocket) the NASA Boeing rocket design concept for a return to the Moon, studied between 1996 and 2004, with an RS-68 engine core and liquid fly back rocket boosters.
