= J-2X =

Liquid-fueled rocket engine

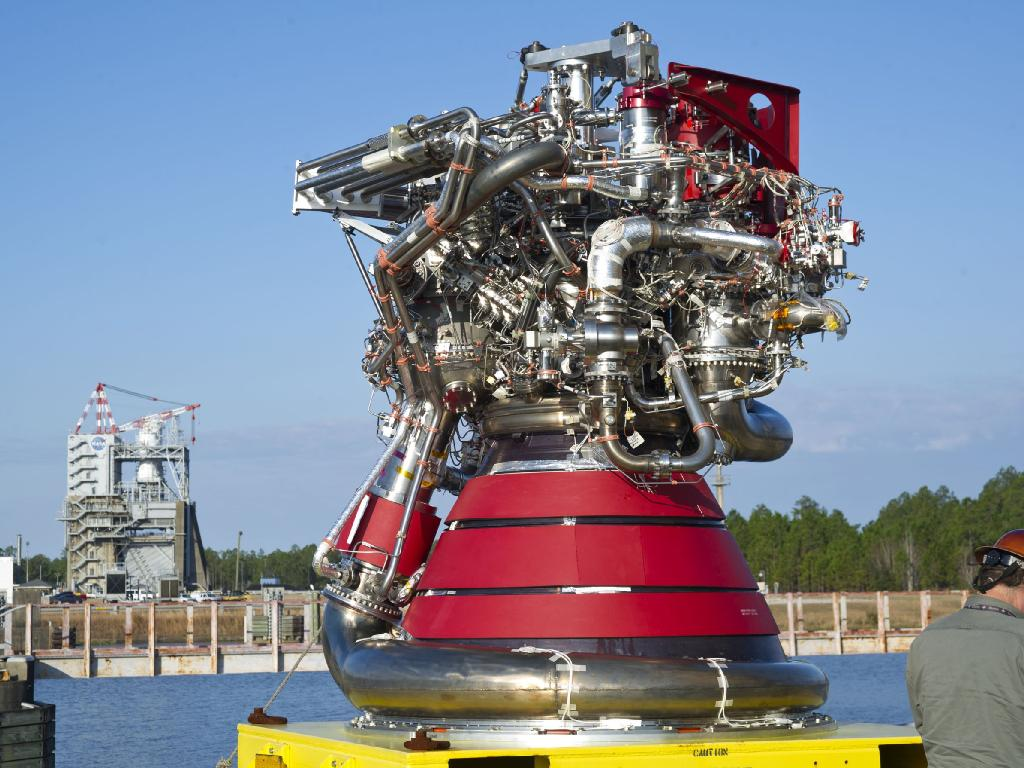
- Aerojet Rocketdyne J-2X engine intended for use on NASA's defunct Ares I and Ares V launch vehicles.
- Country of origin: United States
- Manufacturer: Aerojet Rocketdyne
- Application: Upper stage engine
- Associated LV: Block II Space Launch System (EDS)
- Predecessor: J-2
- Status: Unknown

Liquid-fuel engine
- Propellant: Liquid oxygen / liquid hydrogen
- Mixture ratio: 5.5–4.5
- Cycle: Gas generator

Configuration
- Nozzle ratio: 92:1

Performance
- Thrust, vacuum: 1,307 kN (294,000 lb_{f})
- Thrust-to-weight ratio: 55.04
- Specific impulse, vacuum: 448 seconds (4.39 km/s)

Dimensions
- Length: 4.7 metres (15 ft)
- Diameter: 3 metres (9.8 ft)
- Dry mass: 5,450 pounds (2,470 kg)

The J-2X is a liquid-fueled cryogenic rocket engine that was planned for use on the Ares rockets of NASA's Constellation program, and later the Space Launch System. Built in the United States by Aerojet Rocketdyne (formerly, Pratt & Whitney Rocketdyne), the J-2X burns cryogenic liquid hydrogen and liquid oxygen propellants, with each engine producing 1,307 kN (294,000 lb_{f}) of thrust in vacuum at a specific impulse (I_{sp}) of 448 seconds (4.39 km/s). The engine's mass is approximately 2,470 kg (5,450 Lb), significantly heavier than its predecessors.

The J-2X was intended to be based on the J-2 used on the S-II and S-IVB stages of the Saturn rockets used during the Apollo program, but as required thrust for the Ares I increased due to weight problems it became a clean-sheet design. It entered development in 2007 as part of the now-cancelled Constellation program. Originally planned for use on the upper stages of the Ares I and Ares V rockets, the J-2X was later intended for use in the Earth Departure Stage of the Block 2 Space Launch System, the successor to the Constellation program. The engine is intended to be more efficient and simpler to build than its J-2 ancestor, and cost less than the RS-25 engine. Differences in the new engine include the removal of beryllium, a centrifugal turbo pump versus the axial turbo pump of the J-2, different chamber and nozzle expansion ratios, a channel-walled combustion chamber versus the tube-welded chamber of the J-2, a redesign of all the electronics, a gas generator and supersonic main injector based on the RS-68, and the use of 21st-century joining techniques.

== Testing ==
On 16 July 2007 NASA officially announced the award to Pratt & Whitney Rocketdyne (PWR) of a $1.2 billion contract "for design, development, testing and evaluation of the J-2X engine", and began construction of a new test stand for altitude testing of J-2X engines at Stennis Space Center on 23 August 2007.

Component testing was undertaken between December 2007 and May 2008, with nine tests of heritage J-2 engine components at SSC in preparation for the design of the J-2X engine. and on 8 September 2008 PWR announced successful testing of the initial J-2X gas generator design. The completion of a second round of successful gas generator tests was announced on 21 September 2010.

Starting in 2011, the full J-2X engine, derived from heritage and new designs, has undergone hot-fire tests.

- June 2011: The first hot-fire test.
- November 2011: A test-firing lasting 499.97 seconds.
- June 2012: A test-firing lasting 1,150 seconds, during which the J-2X was throttled up and down.
- July 2012: A test-firing for 1,350 seconds (22 1/2 minutes).
- December 2012: Final test-firing of the powerpack assembly.
- Feb 2013: Testing of engine 10002 begins on test stand A2 for 6 tests.
- June 2013: Engine 10002 moved to test stand A1 for 7 further tests.
- Sept 2013: Final test-firing of engine 10002.
- Nov 2013: Testing of engine 10003 begins.
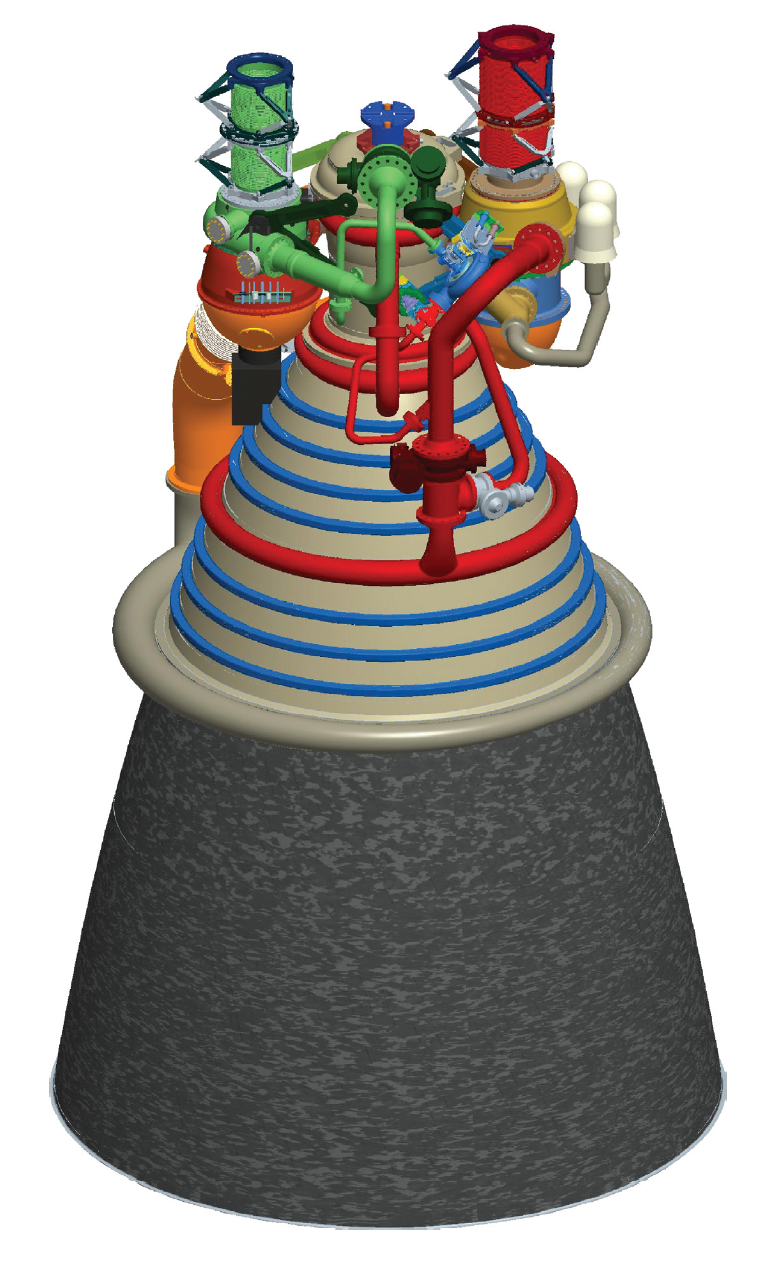
Concept image of the J-2X engine.

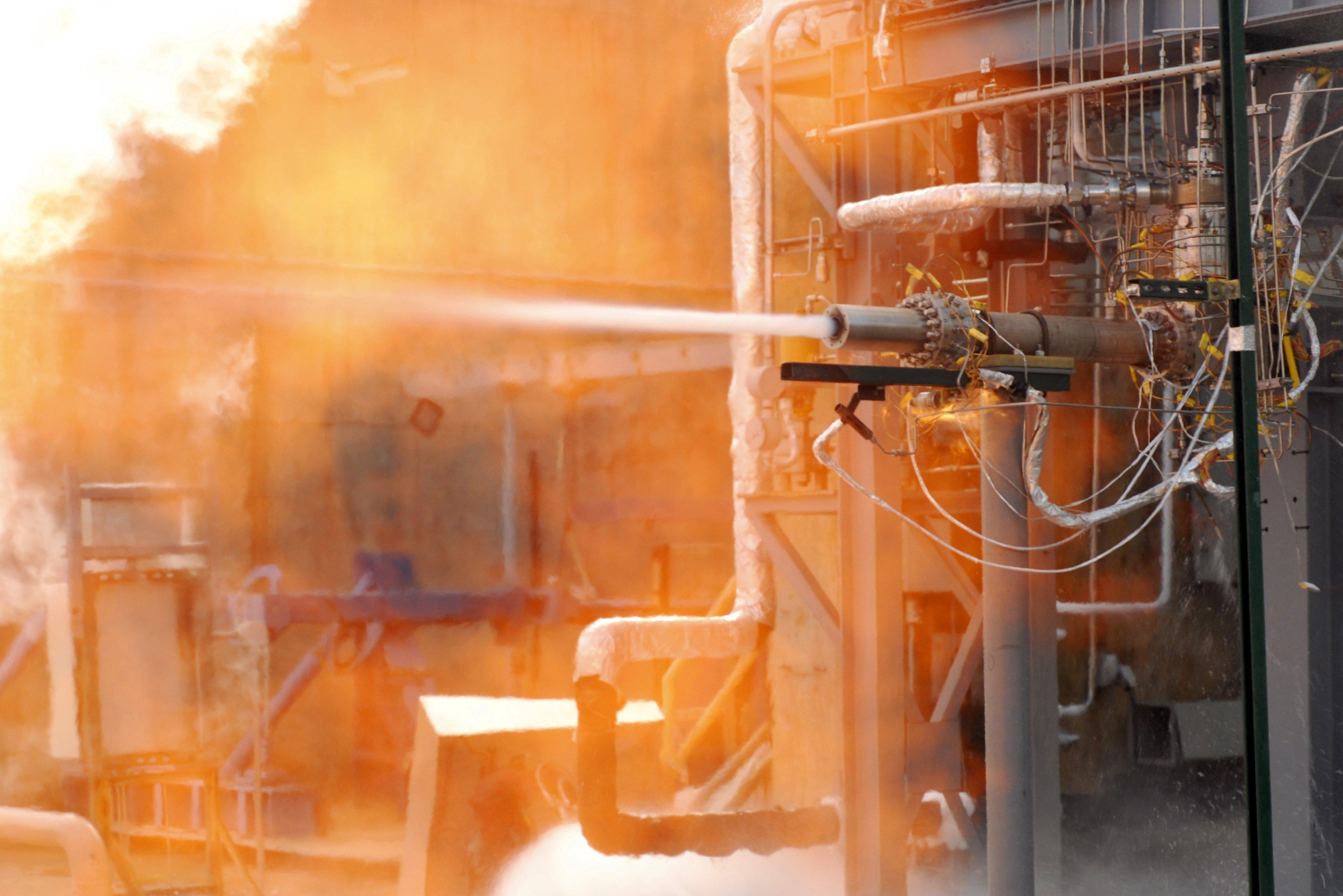
Test of the J-2X engine 'workhorse' gas generator.

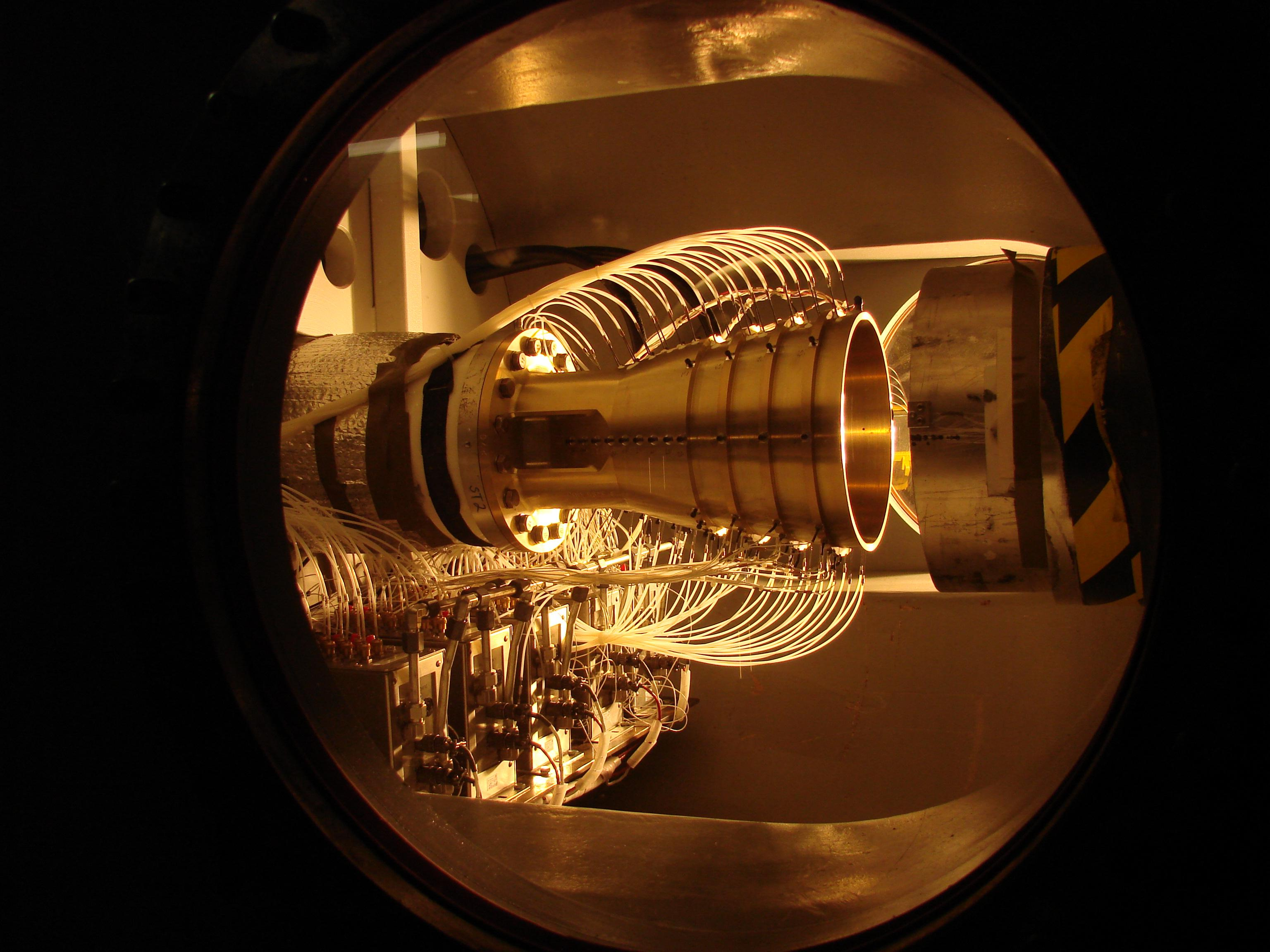
Cold Flow nozzle testing for the J2X program.

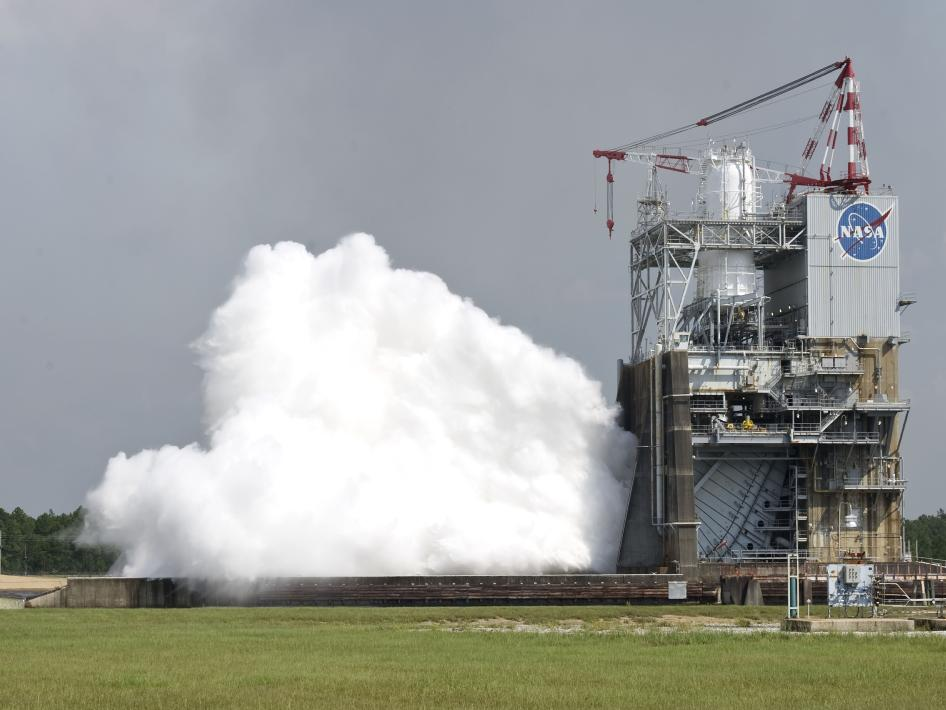
The J-2X being tested at NASA's John C. Stennis Space Center in Hancock County, Mississippi.

== Program status ==
In October 2013, it was reported that work on the J-2X would pause following development testing in 2014, due to funding limitations, an expected delayed need for the engine's capabilities for piloted missions to Mars, and the potential better suitability of the RL10 powered Exploration Upper Stage for SLS.

In September 2022, the components of the J-2X were put up for auction on GSA Auctions, likely confirming the cancellation of the program.

In April 2026, with the cancellation of the Exploration Upper Stage, and barely any updates on the J-2X or EDS, it further solidifies the possibility of cancellation.

== See also ==
- HG-3 engine
- M-1 (rocket engine)
