= Earth Departure Stage =

Proposed component of the Ares V and SLS rockets

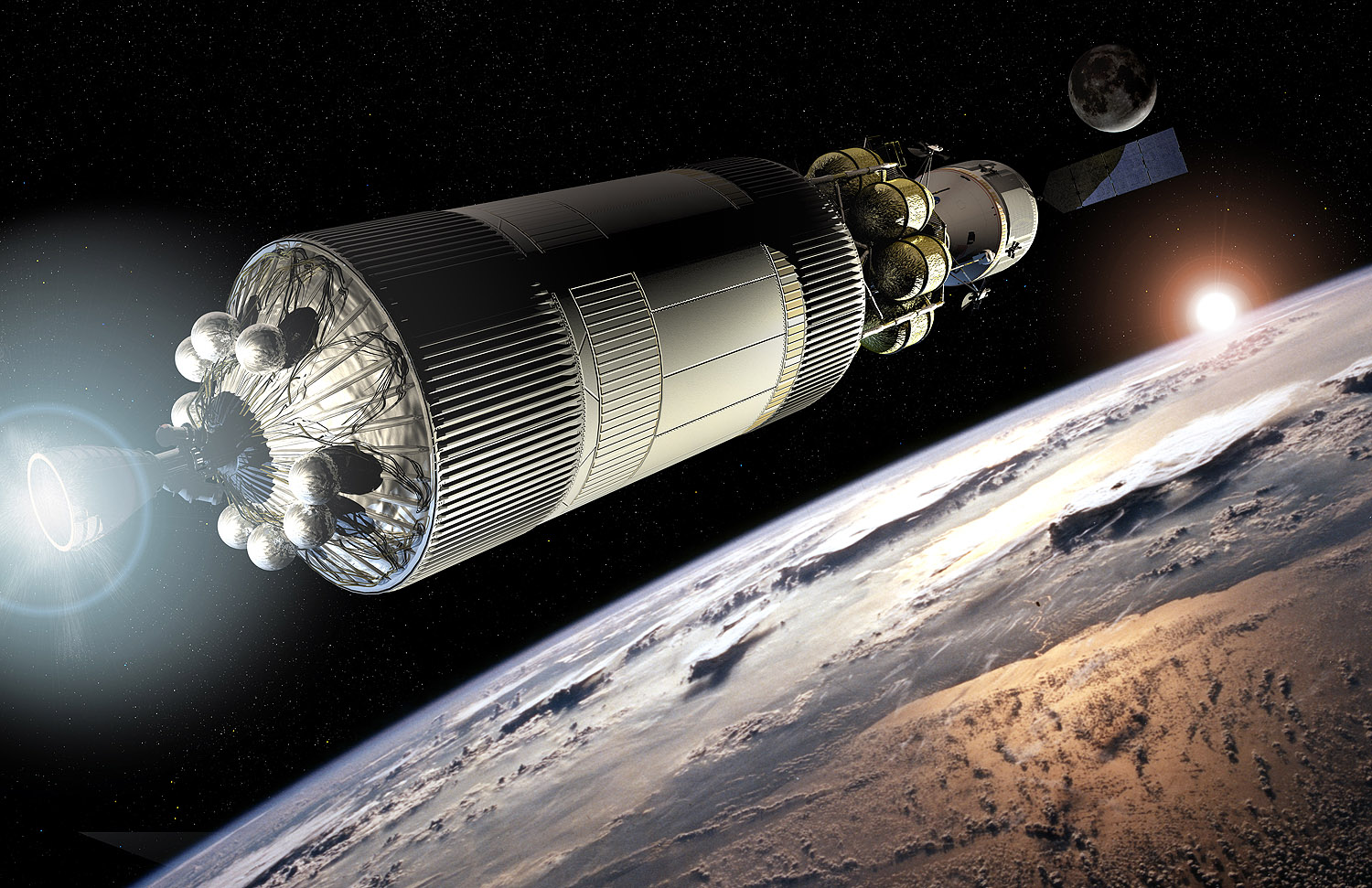
- An Ares V EDS with an Altair lunar lander and Orion.
- Country of origin: United States
- Used on: Ares V SLS Block 2

Associated stages
- Comparable: S-IVB

Launch history
- Status: Cancelled (Ares V); Cancelled (SLS)

Ares V EDS
- Height: 30 metres (98 ft)
- Diameter: 10 metres (33 ft)
- Empty mass: 47,400 kilograms (104,500 lb)
- Gross mass: 294,000 kilograms (648,000 lb)
- Powered by: 1 or 2 J-2X
- Maximum thrust: 1,310 kilonewtons (290,000 lb_{f})
- Specific impulse: 448 s (4.39 km/s) (vacuum)
- Propellant: LH_{2}/LOX

SLS Block II EDS
- Height: 24 metres (79 ft)
- Powered by: 1 or 2 J-2X
- Maximum thrust: 1,310 kilonewtons (290,000 lb_{f})
- Specific impulse: 448 s (4.39 km/s) (vacuum)
- Propellant: LH_{2}/LOX

The Earth Departure Stage (EDS) was the name given to the proposed second stage of the Block 2 Space Launch System. The EDS was intended to boost the rocket's payload into a parking orbit around the Earth and from there send the payload out of low Earth orbit to its destination in a manner similar to that of the S-IVB rocket stage used on the Saturn V rockets that propelled the Apollo spacecraft to the Moon. Its development was initially put on hold until stages capable for Mars are required. It was eventually cancelled in favor of Exploration Upper Stage.

== Ares V ==
=== Design ===
The EDS used on the cancelled Ares V would have been propelled by a single J-2X main engine fuelled with liquid oxygen (LOX) and liquid hydrogen (LH_{2}), and was to have been designed at NASA's Marshall Space Flight Center in Huntsville, Alabama as part of Project Constellation. Originally, the stage would have been based on the Space Shuttle's external tank, and would have used two J-2X engines, while the Ares V core booster would have used five RS-25 engines and two 5-segment Solid Rocket Boosters during the first eight minutes of flight. When the Ares V was then redesigned around the use of five (later six) RS-68B rocket engines used on the Delta IV Heavy as of 2019, the EDS was then redesigned using only a single J-2X engine and a common bulkhead, thus in its final design, the EDS resembled an oversized S-IVB, but with the capability of on-site storage (using new propellant storage techniques along with a "loiter skirt" containing solar panels for electricity) for up to 4 days, something impossible with the old S-IVB.

=== Mission ===
Launched on the Ares V rocket, the EDS with its Altair payload would not have become active until the six RS-68 engines cut off, and the Ares V core was jettisoned to burn up in Earth's atmosphere. Upon separation using the on-board staging and ullage motors, the single J-2X engine would then have fired at full thrust to place itself and the Altair into a low Earth orbit until it was retrieved, via a separate launch on an Ares I, by the Orion MPCV and its four-person astronaut crew.

Once the Orion was docked with the Altair and its systems were checked out, the crew was to jettison the loiter skirt and then fire the J-2X engine for a second time, this time at 80% rated thrust, for trans-lunar injection (TLI). Unlike the S-IVB, which propelled the Apollo spacecraft and its three-man crew in a forward-facing motion, the EDS would have fired with the crew facing the EDS. This "eyeballs out" type of flying would be similar to the flight profile of the proposed, but never flown Manned Venus Flyby, from the cancelled Apollo Applications Program of the late 1960s.

When TLI was completed and the EDS was shut down for the last time, it would then have been jettisoned to fly into a heliocentric orbit, or in a manner similar to that employed by NASA from Apollo 13 to Apollo 17, it may have been deliberately crashed into the lunar surface to help scientists calibrate sensitive seismometers placed on the lunar surface by either astronauts on lunar sortie flights or by uncrewed robotic probes.

== Space Launch System ==
When the Ares program was cancelled in favor of the Space Launch System, the EDS was considered as a second stage for the Block 1B SLS. This version of the stage would have been about 80 feet (24 m) long and equipped with one to three J-2X engines. Technological development of the J-2X was expected to take considerably more time, so the EDS was dropped in favor of the Exploration Upper Stage, which will use the much lower-thrust but already-developed RL10. According to NASA, the J-2X will be overpowered for the Artemis program; its development has been put on hold until stages capable of transferring heavy payloads to Mars are required (expected in the 2030s). The EUS itself was cancelled in February 2026 in favour of using the Centaur V.
