= Exploration Upper Stage =

Cancelled rocket stage for NASA's Space Launch System

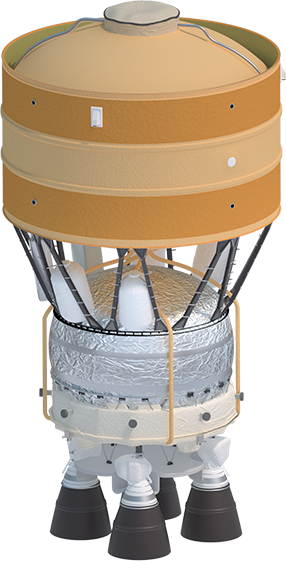
- 2020 design of the Exploration Upper Stage
- Manufacturer: Boeing
- Country of origin: United States
- Used on: Space Launch System (Block 1B/2)

General characteristics
- Height: 17.3 m (57 ft)
- Diameter: LH_{2} tank: 8.4 m (28 ft); LOX tank: 5.5 m (18 ft)
- Propellant mass: 129,000 kg (284,000 lb)
- Empty mass: 14,110 kg (31,110 lb)

Engine details
- Powered by: 4 × RL10C-3
- Maximum thrust: 433.1 kN (97,360 lbf)
- Specific impulse: 460.1 s (4.512 km/s)
- Burn time: 1,275 seconds
- Propellant: LH_{2} / LOX

The Exploration Upper Stage (EUS) was a planned rocket stage for NASA's Space Launch System (SLS) during 2013 to 2026. It was intended for use on the proposed SLS Block 1B and Block 2 configurations, replacing the Interim Cryogenic Propulsion Stage (ICPS) used on the Block 1 variant. The EUS was designed to be powered by four RL10C-3 engines burning liquid oxygen and liquid hydrogen, producing a combined thrust of 433.1 kN (97,360 lbf). Although it progressed through a number of design milestones, the stage never entered full-scale hardware production and was ultimately cancelled, before flight. Its first launch had most recently been planned for Artemis IV in 2028.

In 2025, the Trump administration proposed terminating the SLS and Orion programs after Artemis III, citing cost concerns. Although the United States Congress subsequently provided funding for Artemis IV and V in the One Big Beautiful Bill Act of July 2025, it directed NASA to study commercial alternatives to the EUS. On February 26, 2026, NASA formally cancelled the Exploration Upper Stage and the Block 1B and Block 2 upgrades, opting instead to continue flights using a standardized Block 1 configuration and pursue alternative commercially developed upper-stage, ULA's Centaur V.

The NASA Office of Inspector General (OIG) reported that, at cancellation, NASA had spent nearly $2 billion on the EUS (up from $962 million), with first unit delivery projected in November 2028, well beyond the original March 2021 commitment. The OIG also projected that the final cost could have grown to $3.7 billion. NASA said Boeing's performance on the EUS project was "unsatisfactory", citing production inefficiencies, unrealistic schedules, and a lack of a clear plan for improvement.

== History ==
=== Background ===
Following the 2010 cancellation of the NASA Constellation Program in February, NASA briefly faced a post‑Shuttle gap with no approved system for human exploration beyond low Earth orbit, prompting both NASA-internal studies and a strong response by the U.S. Congress. The U.S. Senate's NASA Authorization Act of 2010, passed on August 5, 2010, directed NASA to develop a new Shuttle‑derived "Space Launch System" using existing Space Shuttle and Constellation/Ares contracts where possible, and set performance goals of 70–100 tonnes to low Earth orbit initially and at least 130 tonnes in later configurations, as well as a requirement to take the existing Orion space capsule program and extend it to an Orion‑derived Multi‑Purpose Crew Vehicle (MPCV), which was to serve as a backup for commercial crew and cargo to the ISS.

Even before Constellation's cancellation, NASA had begun assessing alternative heavy‑lift architectures in response to the 2009 Augustine Committee, producing a May 2010 Heavy Lift Launch Vehicle study that compared Shuttle‑derived designs with kerosene‑fueled concepts and favored RS‑25–based cores derived from the Shuttle External Tank. This work fed into the Human Exploration Framework Team (HEFT), which by September 2010 recommended a Shuttle‑derived baseline using an 8.4‑meter‑diameter core with five RS‑25E engines and two five‑segment solid rocket boosters ("5/5"), capable of lifting more than 100 tonnes to low-Earth orbit without an upper stage, while also examining—but not endorsing—an interim "4/3" configuration using four‑segment boosters, three RS‑25 engines, and reused Shuttle SSMEs to launch payloads of up to 70 tonnes.

After the HEFT study was complete, NASA initiated a requirements analysis cycle where four teams evaluated Shuttle‑derived (hydrolox), kerolox, and modular options, along with cost‑reduction strategies. Team 1 outlined a Shuttle‑derived block evolution culminating in a 130‑tonne‑class vehicle that met the congressional mandate. NASA administrator Charles Bolden ultimately chose to follow the HEFT‑style architecture and skip the "Block 0," minimizing the number of distinct cores and booster types, while Congress added a new requirement for early competition for advanced boosters, with ATK's five‑segment solids used only on initial Block 1 flights. NASA formally announced the Space Launch System on September 14, 2011, establishing Block 1 as the first funded configuration—an 8.4‑meter Shuttle‑derived core using RS‑25D engines and five‑segment solids, paired with an Interim Cryogenic Propulsion Stage (ICPS)—based on the existing 5-meter diameter Delta Cryogenic Second Stage—to support initial uncrewed and crewed missions—and proceeded to award major development contracts, including core‑stage and upper‑stage work led by Boeing.

=== Development ===
The Exploration Upper Stage was an integral part of the evolutionary phased implementation of the NASA Space Launch System (SLS). The EUS was conceived to increase performance beyond Block 1 capabilities, particularly for trans-lunar injection of larger payloads.

The SLS Block 1 configuration, which first flew on Artemis I in 2022, consisted of a core stage powered by four RS-25 engines, two five-segment solid rocket boosters, and the ICPS upper stage.

Originally named the Dual Use Upper Stage (DUUS pronounced "duce"), the stage was later renamed the Exploration Upper Stage (EUS) due to concerns that DUUS sounded like a profanity in Japanese. In 2014, NASA confirmed development of the SLS Block 1B configuration using the EUS, at that time targeting its debut in 2021 on what was later renamed to Artemis II. A 2014 Boeing presentation named the upper stage as the "Large Upper Stage (LUS)".

In April 2016, NASA selected a configuration using four RL10-C3 engines, and later ordered 10 engines for the program. In 2018, NASA decided to optimize the EUS for lunar missions by using smaller tanks.

By February 2020, delays in the development contract led NASA to plan on using the phase 1 ICPS upper stage for the first three SLS launches, with the first flight of the EUS not planned until Artemis IV in 2028. The stage completed a critical design review in December 2020, clearing it for continued development.

In March 2022, Boeing explored the use of a carbon composite liquid oxygen tank on the EUS, which could reduce mass by up to 30%.

On May 2, 2025, the Trump administration released its fiscal year 2026 budget proposal, which called for terminating the SLS and Orion spacecraft programs after Artemis III. The proposal described the SLS program as "grossly expensive" and exceeding its budget, and allocated funding to transition to "more cost-effective commercial systems". However, Congress, through the One Big Beautiful Bill Act which Trump signed into law in July 2025, provided $4.1 billion in funding for the SLS units for Artemis IV and V, though it did direct NASA to investigate adopting commercial alternatives to EUS.

On February 26, 2026, NASA announced the cancellation of the Exploration Upper Stage and the Block 1B and 2 upgrades, opting instead to continue flights using a "standardized" Block 1 configuration, likely using an existing upper stage like ULA's Centaur V. NASA reported that all of the agency's key contractors, including Boeing, were on board with the change, and senior leaders in Congress had been briefed on the proposed changes. In a NASA news release, Boeing appeared to offer at least some support for the revised plans.

== Funding ==
=== SLS upper stage ===
Between 2013-2016, the upper stage was not given a budget separate to general SLS launch vehicle development. Between 2017-2020, the upper stage is listed as the "Enhanced Upper Stage (EUS)" in the budget. From 2021-2024, EUS costs are bundled with Block 1B costs and labelled "Block 1B (non-add)" or "Block 1B (non-add) (including EUS)".

Fiscal year	Nominal (in millions)	Inflation adjusted (in millions, adjusted to 2025)	Listed in budget as
2016	$77	$103.3	Unknown
2017	$300	$394	Enhanced Upper Stage (EUS)
2018	$300	$384.6	Enhanced Upper Stage (EUS)
2019	$150	$188.9	Enhanced Upper Stage (EUS)
2020	$300	$373.2	Enhanced Upper Stage (EUS)
2021	$400	$475.3	Block 1B (including EUS)
2022	$636.7	$700.5	Block 1B
2023	$648.3	$685	Block 1B (including EUS)
2024	$462.5	$474.7	Block 1B

==== Total development costs ====
In 2025, the spending plan reverted back to listing an overall SLS launch vehicle development cost for the year, but gave the total cumulative EUS development cost as $1.93 billion.

Further SLS Block 1B funding is not requested in the FY 2027 budget, and its total development cost is estimated as $3.9047 billion.

=== Other costs ===
Kennedy Space Center modifications to facilitate the Exploration Upper Stage were budgeted to cost $90.1 million in 2018, and £13.3 million in 2019.

== See also ==
- Delta Cryogenic Second Stage
- Earth Departure Stage
- S-IVB
- Inertial Upper Stage
