= Ares I =

Canceled NASA rocket key to the Constellation program

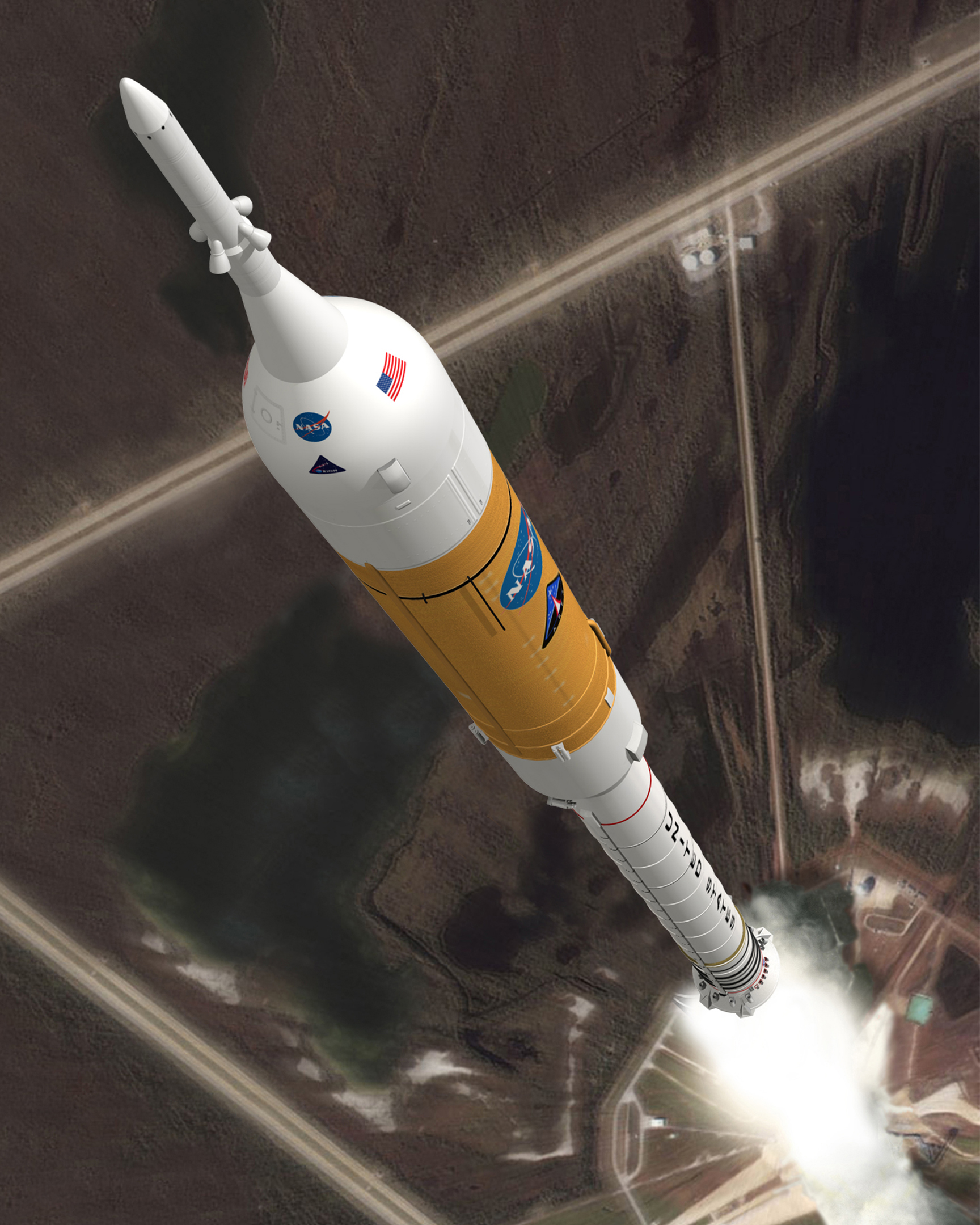
- Ares I launch (concept image)
- Function: Heavy-lift launch vehicle
- Manufacturer: Alliant Techsystems; Boeing
- Country of origin: United States
- Project cost: At least US$6 billion

Size
- Height: 94 m (308 ft)
- Diameter: 5.5 m (18 ft)
- Stages: 2

Capacity

Payload to LEO
- Mass: 25,400 kg (56,000 lb)

Associated rockets
- Family: Followed by Liberty, would have complemented Ares V

Launch history
- Status: Cancelled
- Launch sites: Kennedy, LC-39B (planned)
- Total launches: 1 (prototype)
- UTC date of spacecraft launch: October 2009 (prototype)

First stage – five-segment SRB
- Height: 54 m (177 ft)
- Diameter: 3.7 m (12 ft)
- Gross mass: 730,000 kg (1,600,000 lb)
- Maximum thrust: SL: 14.6 MN (3,280,000 lbf); vac: 16 MN (3,600,000 lbf)
- Specific impulse: 269 s (2.64 km/s)
- Burn time: 126 seconds
- Propellant: APCP (Al / AP / PBAN)

Second stage
- Powered by: 1 × J-2X
- Maximum thrust: 1,308 kN (294,000 lb_{f})
- Burn time: ≈800 seconds
- Propellant: LH_{2} / LOX

Ares I was the crew launch vehicle that was being developed by NASA as part of the Constellation program. The name "Ares" refers to the Greek deity Ares, who is identified with the Roman god Mars. Ares I was originally known as the "Crew Launch Vehicle" (CLV).

NASA planned to use Ares I to launch Orion, the spacecraft intended for NASA human spaceflight missions after the Space Shuttle was retired in 2011. Ares I was to complement the larger, uncrewed Ares V, which was the cargo launch vehicle for Constellation. NASA selected the Ares designs for their anticipated overall safety, reliability and cost-effectiveness. However, the Constellation program, including Ares I, was cancelled by U.S. president Barack Obama in October 2010 with the passage of his 2010 NASA authorization bill. In September 2011, NASA detailed the Space Launch System as its new vehicle for human exploration beyond Earth's orbit.

== Development ==
=== Advanced Transportation System Studies ===
In 1995 Lockheed Martin produced an Advanced Transportation System Studies (ATSS) report for the Marshall Space Flight Center. A section of the ATSS report describes several possible vehicles much like the Ares I design, with liquid rocket second stages stacked above segmented solid rocket booster (SRB) first stages. The variants that were considered included both the J-2S engines and Space Shuttle Main Engines (SSMEs) for the second stage. The variants also assumed use of the Advanced Solid Rocket Motor (ASRM) as a first stage, but the ASRM was cancelled in 1993 due to significant cost overruns.

=== Exploration Systems Architecture Study ===
President George W. Bush had announced the Vision for Space Exploration in January 2004, and NASA under Sean O'Keefe had solicited plans for a Crew Exploration Vehicle from multiple bidders, with the plan for having two competing teams. These plans were discarded by incoming administrator Michael Griffin, and on April 29, 2005, NASA chartered the Exploration Systems Architecture Study to accomplish specific goals:

- determine the "top-level requirements and configurations for crew and cargo launch systems to support the lunar and Mars exploration programs"
- assess the "CEV requirements and plans to enable the CEV to provide crew transport to the ISS"
- "develop a reference lunar exploration architecture concept to support sustained human and robotic lunar exploration operations"
- "identify key technologies required to enable and significantly enhance these reference exploration systems"

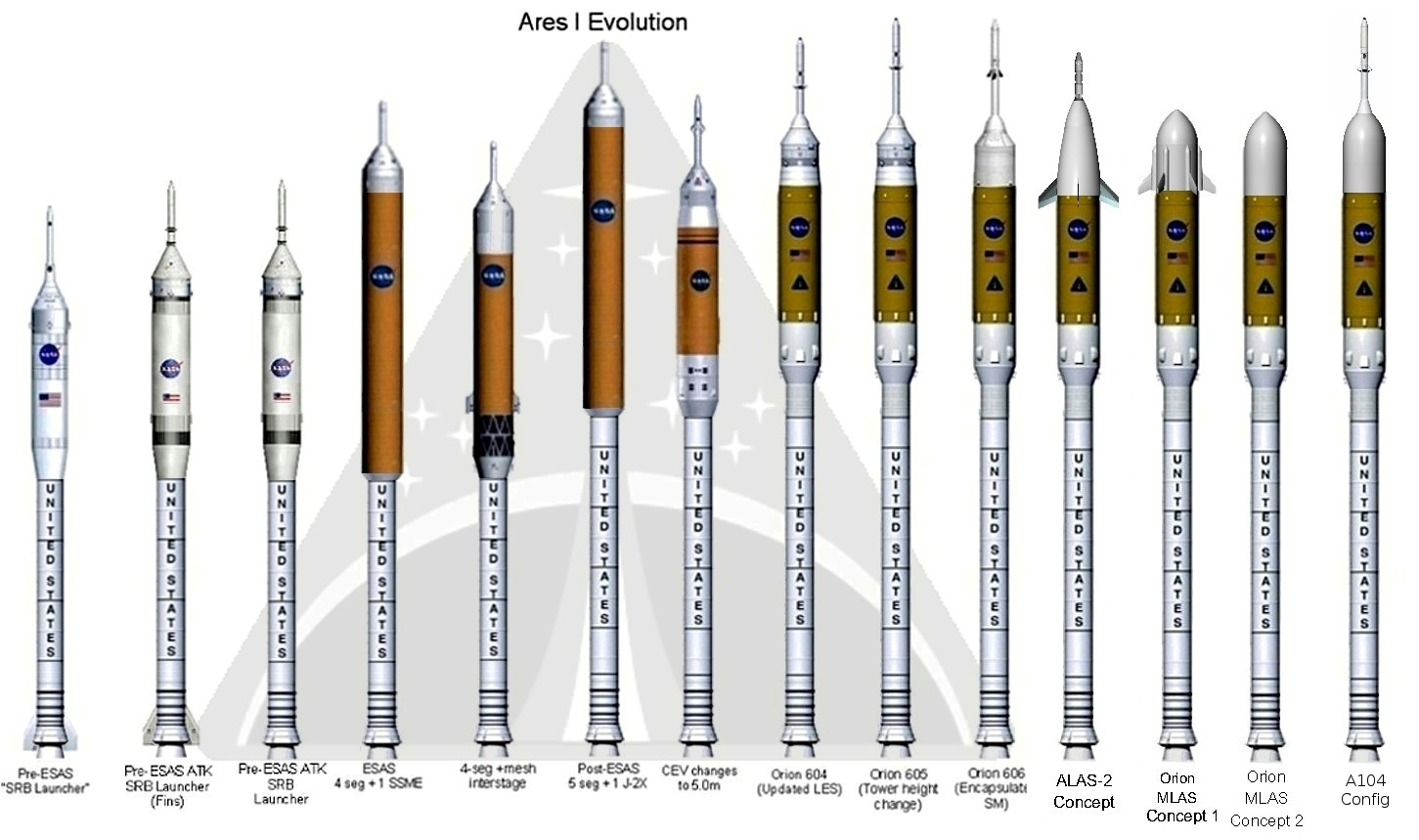
Concept image of the evolution of the Ares I design from pre-ESAS to latest developments

A Shuttle-derived launch architecture was selected by NASA for the Ares I. Originally, the crewed vehicle would have used a four-segment solid rocket booster (SRB) for the first stage, and a simplified Space Shuttle Main Engine (SSME) for the second stage. An uncrewed version was to use a five-segment booster with the same second stage. Shortly after the initial design was approved, additional tests revealed that the Orion spacecraft would be too heavy for the four-segment booster to lift, and in January 2006 NASA announced they would slightly reduce the size of the Orion spacecraft, add a fifth segment to the solid-rocket first stage, and replace the single SSME with the Apollo-derived J-2X motor. While the change from a four-segment first stage to a five-segment version would allow NASA to construct virtually identical motors, the main reason for the change to the five-segment booster was the move to the J-2X.

The Exploration Systems Architecture Study concluded that the cost and safety of the Ares was superior to that of either of the Evolved Expendable Launch Vehicle (EELVs). The cost estimates in the study were based on the assumption that new launch pads would be needed for human-rated EELVs. The facilities for the current EELVs (LC-37 for Delta IV, LC-41 for Atlas V) are in place and could be modified, but this may not have been the most cost effective solution as LC-37 is a contractor owned and operated (COGO) facility and modifications for the Delta IV H were determined to be similar to those required for Ares I. The ESAS launch safety estimates for the Ares were based on the Space Shuttle, despite the differences, and included only launches after the post-Challenger Space Shuttle redesign. The estimate counted each Shuttle launch as two safe launches of the Ares booster. The safety of the Atlas V and Delta IV was estimated from the failure rates of all Delta II, Atlas-Centaur, and Titan launches since 1992, although they are not similar designs.

=== Role in Constellation program ===
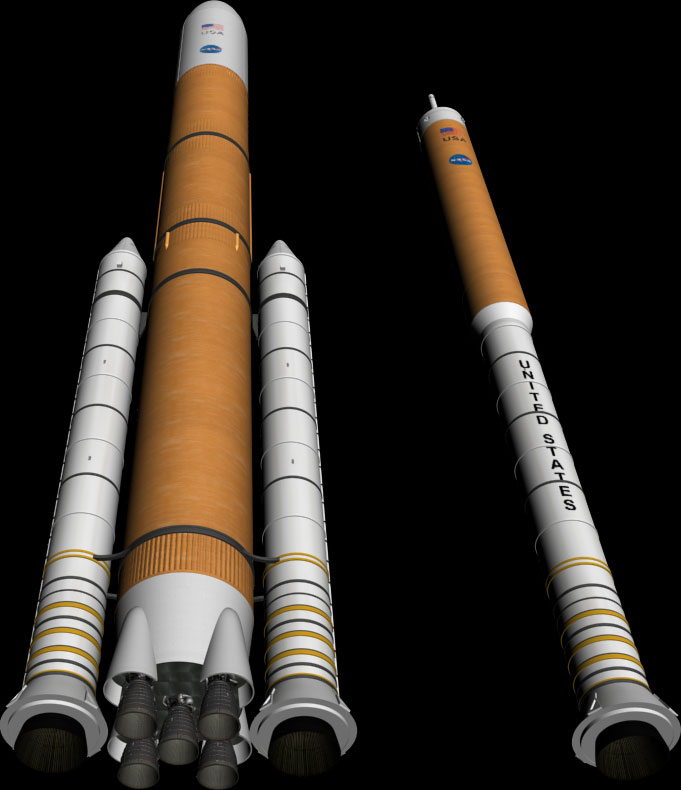
An early concept image of the Ares I (right) and Ares V (left) rockets

Ares I was the crew launch component of the Constellation program. Originally named the "Crew Launch Vehicle" or CLV, the Ares name was chosen from the Greek deity Ares. Unlike the Space Shuttle, where both crew and cargo were launched simultaneously on the same rocket, the plans for Project Constellation outlined having two separate launch vehicles, the Ares I and the Ares V, for crew and cargo, respectively. Having two separate launch vehicles allows for more specialized designs for the crew and heavy cargo launch rockets.

The Ares I rocket was specifically being designed to launch the Orion Multi-Purpose Crew Vehicle. Orion was intended as a crew capsule, similar in design to the Apollo program capsule, to transport astronauts to the International Space Station, the Moon, and eventually Mars. Ares I might have also delivered some (limited) resources to orbit, including supplies for the International Space Station or subsequent delivery to the planned lunar base.

=== Contractor selection ===
NASA selected Alliant Techsystems, the builder of the Space Shuttle Solid Rocket Boosters, as the prime contractor for the Ares I first stage. NASA announced that Rocketdyne would be the main subcontractor for the J-2X rocket engine on July 16, 2007. NASA selected Boeing to provide and install the avionics for the Ares I rocket on December 12, 2007.

On August 28, 2007, NASA awarded the Ares I Upper Stage manufacturing contract to Boeing. The upper stage of Ares I was to have been built at Michoud Aerospace Factory, which was used for the Space Shuttle's External Tank and the Saturn V's S-IC first stage.

=== J-2X engines ===
At approximately US$20–25 million per engine, the Rocketdyne-designed and produced J-2X would have cost less than half as much as the more complex RS-25 engine (around $55 million). Unlike the Space Shuttle Main Engine, which was designed to start on the ground, the J-2X was designed from inception to be started in both mid-air and in near-vacuum. This air-start capability was critical, especially in the original J-2 engine used on the Saturn V's S-IVB stage, to propel the Apollo spacecraft to the Moon. The Space Shuttle Main Engine, on the other hand, would have required extensive modifications to add an air-start capability

=== System requirements review ===
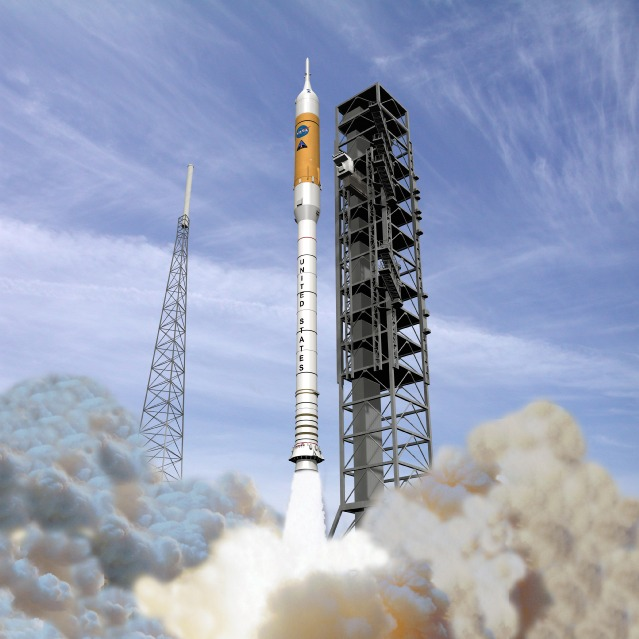
A concept image of an Ares I launching from Kennedy Space Center launchpad 39B

On January 4, 2007, NASA announced that the Ares I had completed its system requirements review, the first such review completed for any crewed spacecraft design since the Space Shuttle. This review was the first major milestone in the design process, and was intended to ensure that the Ares I launch system met all the requirements necessary for the Constellation Program. In addition to the release of the review, NASA also announced that a redesign in the tank hardware was made. Instead of separate LH_{2} and LO_{2} tanks, separated by an "intertank" like that of the Space Shuttle External Tank, the new LH_{2} and LOX tanks would have been separated by a common bulkhead like that employed on the Saturn V S-II and S-IVB stages. This would have provided a significant mass saving and eliminated the need to design a second stage interstage unit that would have had to carry the weight of the Orion spacecraft with it.

=== Analysis and testing ===
In January 2008, NASA Watch revealed that the first stage solid rocket of the Ares I could have created high vibrations during the first few minutes of ascent. The vibrations would have been caused by thrust oscillations inside the first stage. NASA officials had identified the potential problem at the Ares I system design review in late October 2007, stating in a press release that it wanted to solve it by March 2008. NASA admitted that this problem was very severe, rating it four out of five on a risk scale, but the agency was very confident in solving it. The mitigation approach developed by the Ares engineering team included active and passive vibration damping, adding an active tuned-mass absorber and a passive "compliance structure" – essentially a spring-loaded ring that would have detuned the Ares I stack. NASA also pointed out that, since this would have been a new launch system, like the Apollo or Space Shuttle systems, it was normal for such problems to arise during the development stage. According to NASA, analysis of the data and telemetry from the Ares I-X flight showed that vibrations from thrust oscillation were within the normal range for a Space Shuttle flight.

A study released in July 2009 by the 45th Space Wing of the US Air Force concluded that an abort 30–60 seconds after launch would have a ≈100% chance of killing all crew, due to the capsule being engulfed until ground impact by a cloud of 4,000 °F (2,200 °C) solid propellant fragments, which would melt the capsule's nylon parachute material. NASA's study showed the crew capsule would have flown beyond the more severe danger.

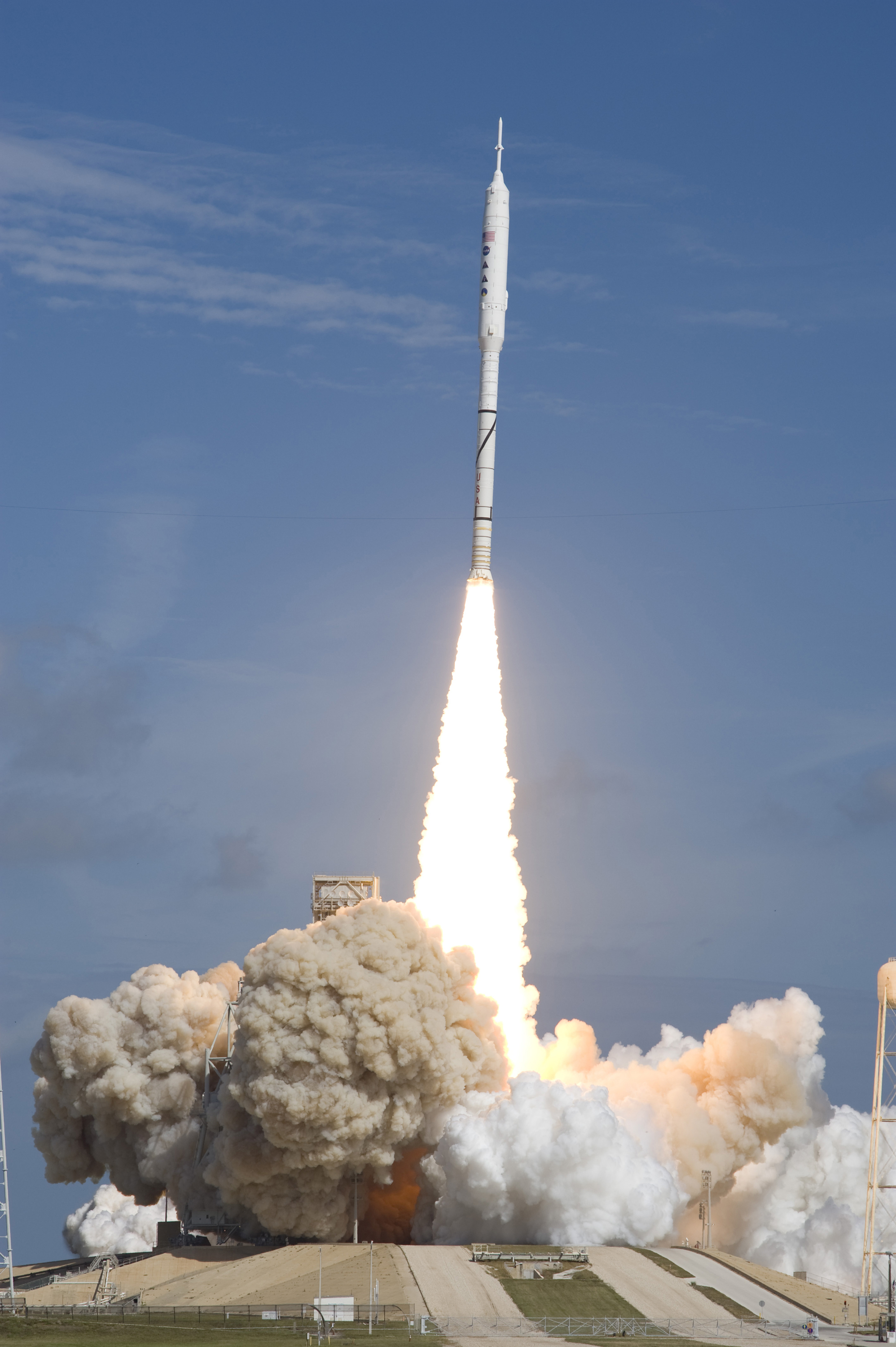
Ares I-X launches from Kennedy Space Center launch pad 39B on October 28, 2009.

The Ares I igniter was an advanced version of the flight-proven igniter used on the Space Shuttle's solid rocket boosters. It was approximately 18 inches (46 cm) in diameter and 36 inches (91 cm) long, and took advantage of upgraded insulation materials that had improved thermal properties to protect the igniter's case from the burning solid propellant. NASA successfully completed test firing of the igniter for the Ares I engines on March 10, 2009, at ATK Launch Systems test facilities near Promontory, Utah. The igniter test generated a flame 200 feet (61 meters) in length, and preliminary data showed the igniter performed as planned.

Development of the Ares I propulsion elements continued to make strong progress. On September 10, 2009, the first Ares I development motor (DM-1) was successfully tested in a full-scale, full-duration test firing. This test was followed by two more development motor tests, DM-2 on August 31, 2010, and DM-3 on September 8, 2011. For DM-2 the motor was cooled to a core temperature of 40 degrees Fahrenheit (4 degrees Celsius), and for DM-3 it was heated to above 90 degrees Fahrenheit (32 degrees Celsius). In addition to other objectives, these two tests validated Ares motor performance at extreme temperatures. NASA conducted a successful 500-second test firing of the J-2X rocket engine at John C. Stennis Space Center in November 2011.

The Ares I prototype, Ares I-X, successfully completed a test launch on October 28, 2009. Launch Pad 39B was damaged more than with a Space Shuttle launch. During descent, one of the three parachutes of the Ares I-X's first stage failed to open, and another opened only partially, causing the booster to splash down harder and suffer structural damage. The launch accomplished all primary test objectives.

=== Schedule and cost ===
NASA completed the Ares I system requirements review in January 2007. Project design was to have continued through the end of 2009, with development and qualification testing running concurrently through 2012. As of July 2009, flight articles were to have begun production towards the end of 2009 for a first launch in June 2011. Since 2006 the first launch of a human was planned for no later than 2014, which is four years after the planned retirement of the Space Shuttle.

Delays in the Ares I development schedule due to budgetary pressures and unforeseen engineering and technical difficulties would have increased the gap between the end of the Space Shuttle program and the first operational flight of Ares I. Because the Constellation program was never allocated the funding originally projected, the total estimated cost to develop the Ares I through 2015 rose from $28 billion in 2006 to more than $40 billion in 2009. The Ares I-X project cost was $445 million.

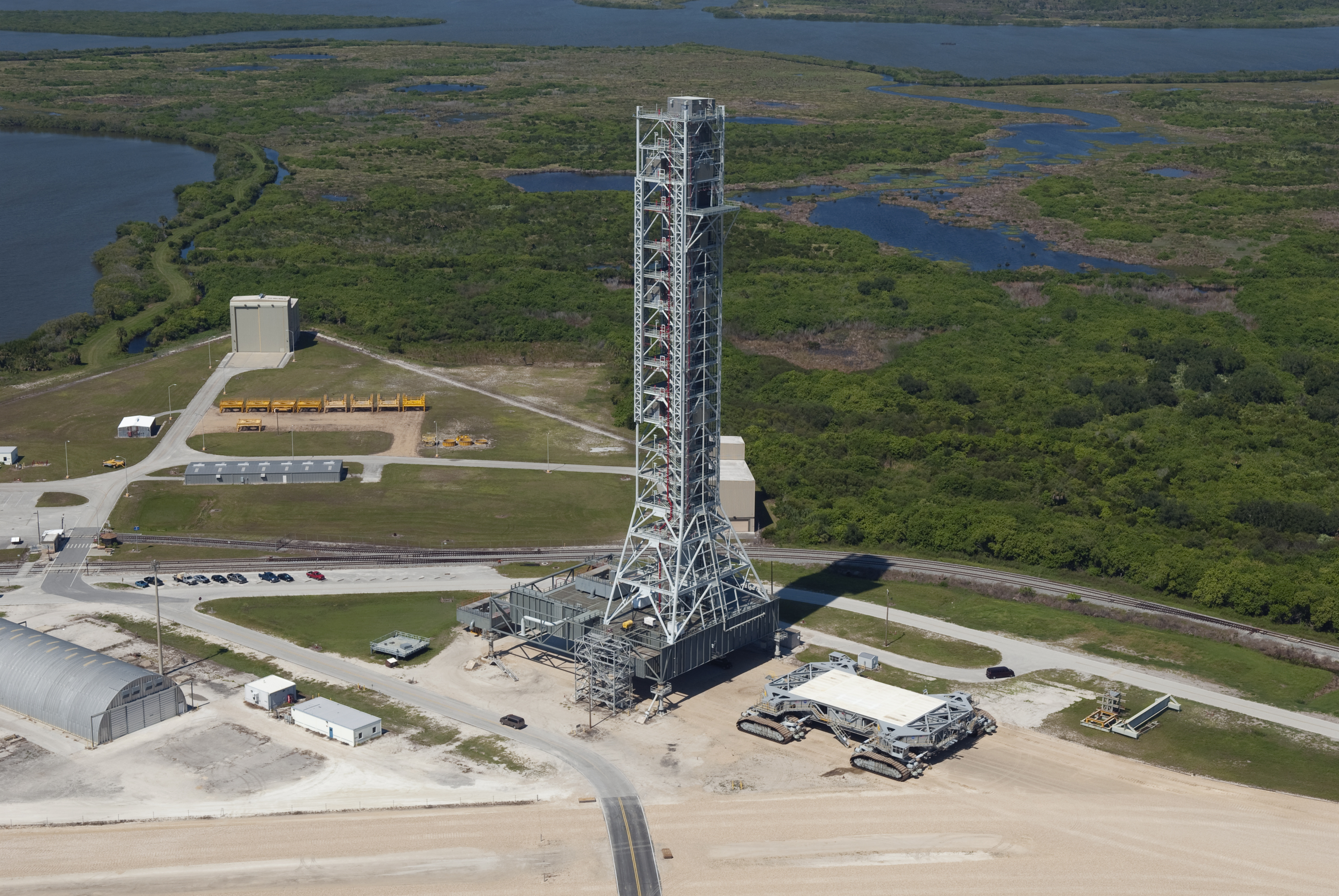
Mobile Launcher-1 for Ares I at east park site

Originally scheduled for first test flights in 2011, the independent analysis by the Augustine Commission found in late 2009 that due to technical and financial problems Ares I was not likely to have had its first crewed launch until 2017–2019 under the current budget, or late 2016 with an unconstrained budget. The Augustine Commission also stated that Ares I and Orion would have an estimated recurring cost of almost $1 billion per flight. However, later financial analysis in March 2010 showed that the Ares I would have cost $1 billion or more to operate per flight had the Ares I flown just once a year. If the Ares I system were flown multiple times a year the marginal costs could have fallen to as low as $138 million per launch. In March 2010, NASA administrator Charlie Bolden testified to congress that the Ares I would cost $4–4.5 billion a year, and $1.6 billion per flight. The Ares I marginal cost was predicted to have been a fraction of the Shuttle's marginal costs even had it flown multiple times per year. By comparison, the cost of launching three astronauts on a crewed Russian Soyuz is $153 million. Representative Robert Aderholt stated in March 2010 that he had received a letter from NASA which claimed that it would have cost $1.1 billion to fly the Ares I rocket three times a year.

On February 8, 2011, it was reported that Alliant Techsystems and Astrium proposed to use Ares I's first stage with a second stage derived from the Ariane 5 core stage to form a new rocket named Liberty.

=== Cancellation ===
On February 1, 2010, President Barack Obama announced a proposal to cancel the Constellation program effective with the U.S. 2011 fiscal year budget, but later announced changes to the proposal in a major space policy speech at Kennedy Space Center on April 15, 2010. In October 2010, the NASA Authorization Act of 2010 was signed into law, which canceled Constellation. Previous legislation kept Constellation contracts in force until passage of a new funding bill for 2011.

== Design ==
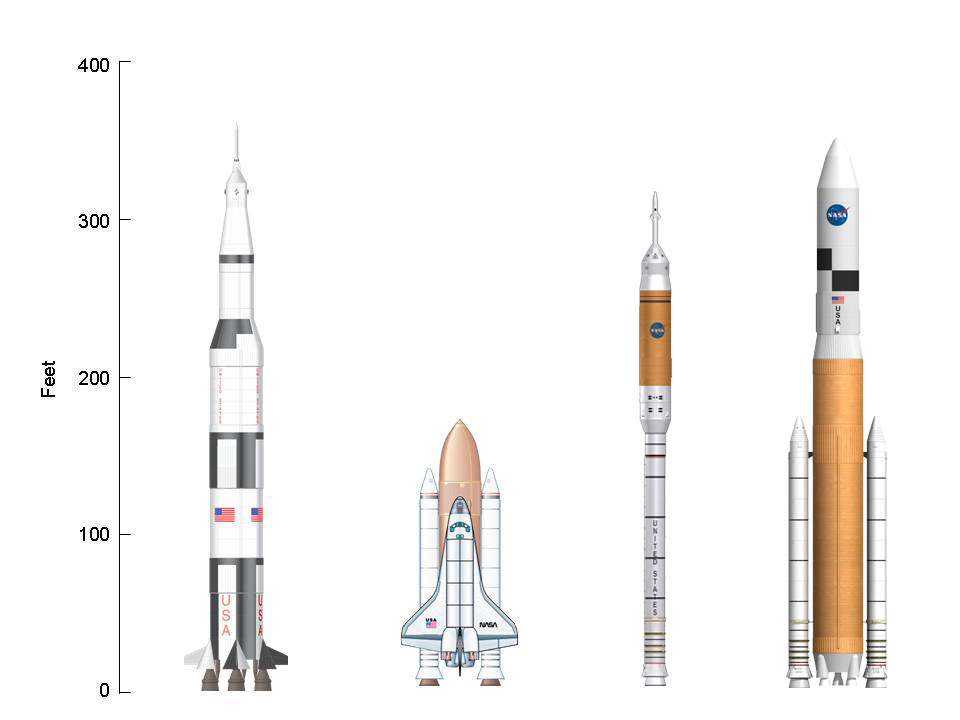
Comparison of the basic size and shape of the Saturn V, Space Shuttle, Ares I, and Ares V

Ares I had a payload capability in the 25-tonne (28-short-ton; 25-long-ton) class and was comparable to vehicles such as the Delta IV and the Atlas V. The NASA study group that selected what would become the Ares I rated the vehicle as almost twice as safe as an Atlas or Delta IV-derived design.

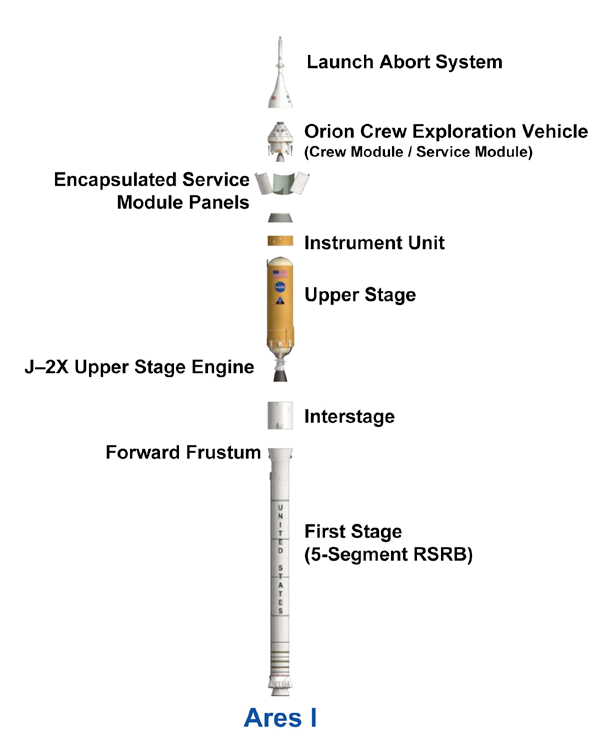
Exploded view of the Ares I

=== First stage ===
The first stage was to have been a more powerful and reusable solid fuel rocket derived from the Space Shuttle Solid Rocket Booster (SRB). Compared with the Solid Rocket Booster, which had four segments, the most notable difference was the addition of a fifth segment. This fifth segment would have enabled the Ares I to produce more thrust. Other changes made to the Solid Rocket Booster were to have been the removal of the Space Shuttle External Tank (ET) attachment points and the replacement of the Solid Rocket Booster nosecone with a new forward adapter that would have interfaced with the liquid-fueled second stage. The adapter was to have been equipped with solid-fueled separation motors to facilitate the disconnection of the stages during ascent. The grain design was also changed, and so were the insulation and liner. By the Ares I first stage ground test, the case, grain design, number of segments, insulation, liner, throat diameter, thermal protection systems and nozzle had all changed.

=== Upper stage ===
The upper stage, derived from the Shuttle's External Tank (ET) and based on the S-IVB stage of the Saturn V, was to be propelled by a single J-2X rocket engine fueled by liquid hydrogen (LH_{2}) and liquid oxygen (LOX). The J-2X was derived from the original J-2 engine used during the Apollo program, but with more thrust (≈294,000 lbf or 1.31 MN) and fewer parts than the original engine. On July 16, 2007, NASA awarded Rocketdyne a sole-source contract for the J-2X engines to be used for ground and flight tests. Rocketdyne was the prime contractor for the original J-2 engines used in the Apollo program.

Although its J-2X engine was derived from an established design, the upper stage itself would have been wholly new. Originally to have been based on both the internal and external structure of the ET, the original design called for separate fuel and oxidizer tanks, joined by an "intertank" structure, and covered with the spray-on foam insulation to keep venting to a minimum. The only new hardware on the original ET-derived second stage would have been the thrust assembly for the J-2X engine, new fill/drain/vent disconnects for the fuel and oxidizer, and mounting interfaces for the solid-fueled first stage and the Orion spacecraft.

Using a concept going back to the Apollo program, the "intertank" structure was dropped to decrease mass, and in its place, a common bulkhead, similar to that used on both the S-II and S-IVB stages of the Saturn V, would have been used between the tanks. The savings from these changes were used to increase propellant capacity, which was 297,900 pounds (135,100 kg).

== See also ==
- Ares IV, a proposed heavy-lift variant of Ares I and V combined.
- DIRECT, shuttle-derived launcher proposed as alternative to Ares I and Ares V.
- Liberty (rocket), a proposed medium-lift rocket like the Ares I, a SDLV using an SRB-derivative first stage
- Omega, ATK's proposed new rocket based on SDLV SRB-derived first and second stages and Aerojet Rocketdyne RL10 third stage
- List of Constellation missions
- Boilerplate (spaceflight)
