= S-IVB =

Upper stage rocket used by NASA in 1960-70s

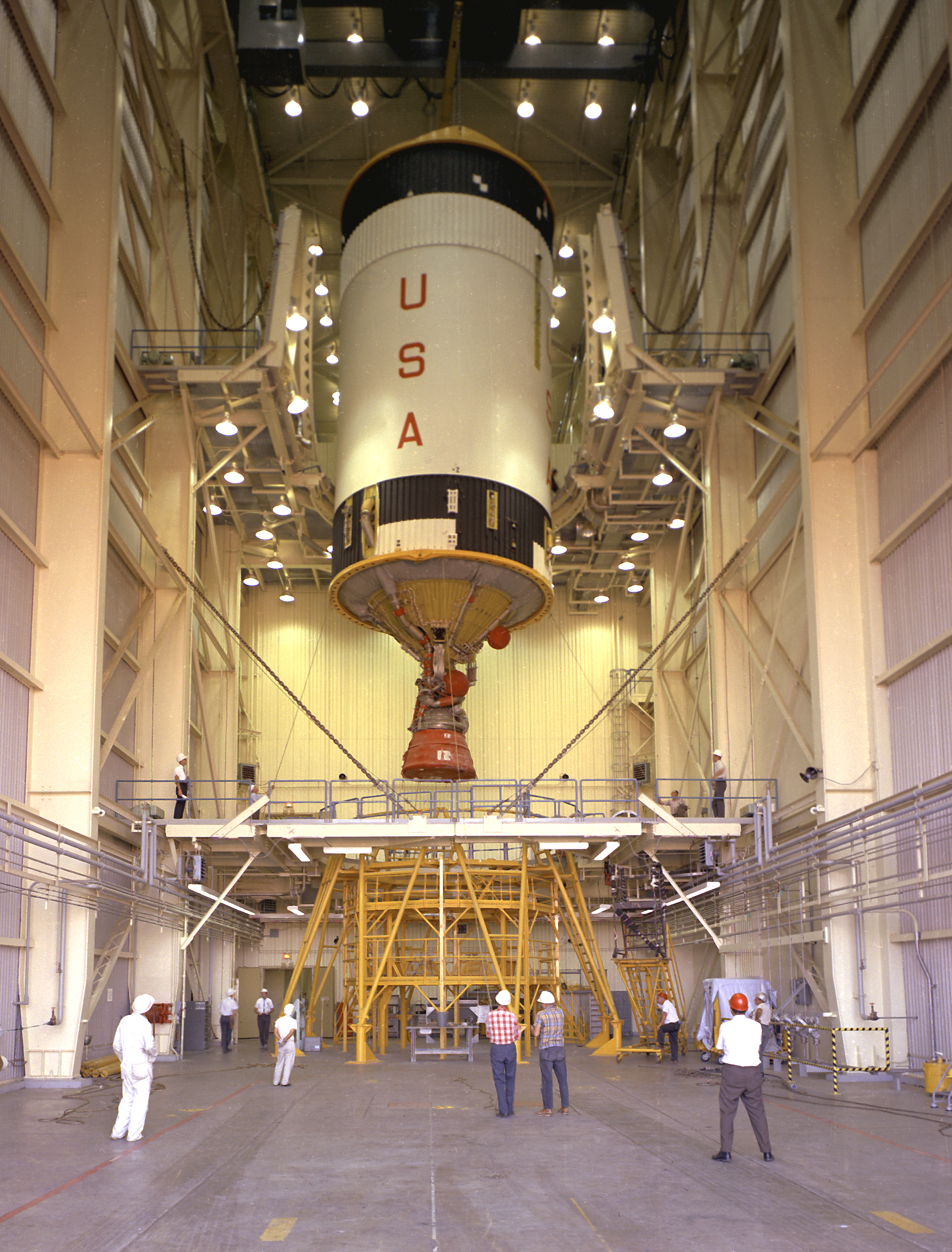
- S-IVB-206 which was used for the Skylab 2 flight
- Manufacturer: Douglas
- Country of origin: United States
- Used on: Saturn IB (stage 2); Saturn V (stage 3)

General characteristics
- Height: 58 ft 5 in (17.81 m)
- Diameter: 21 ft 8 in (6.60 m)
- Gross mass: 271,000 lb (123,000 kg)
- Propellant mass: 241,300 lb (109,500 kg)
- Empty mass: 29,700 lb (13,500 kg)

Launch history
- Status: Retired
- Total launches: 21
- Successes (stage only): 20
- Other: Restart failure (Apollo 6)
- First flight: February 26, 1966
- Last flight: July 15, 1975

S-IVB 200 series
- Powered by: 1 × J-2
- Maximum thrust: 200,000 lbf (890 kN)
- Specific impulse: 420 s (4.1 km/s)
- Burn time: 480 seconds
- Propellant: LH_{2} / LOX

S-IVB 500 series
- Powered by: 1 × J-2
- Maximum thrust: 232,250 lbf (1,033.1 kN)
- Specific impulse: 421 s (4.13 km/s)
- Burn time: 500 seconds
- Propellant: LH_{2} / LOX

The S-IVB (pronounced "S-four-B") was the third stage on the Saturn V and second stage on the Saturn IB launch vehicles. Built by the Douglas Aircraft Company, it had one J-2 rocket engine. For lunar missions it was fired twice: first for Earth orbit insertion after second stage cutoff, and then for translunar injection (TLI).

== History ==
The S-IVB evolved from the upper stage of the Saturn I rocket (the S-IV) and was the first stage of the Saturn V to be designed. The S-IV used a cluster of six RL10 engines but used the same fuels as the S-IVB – liquid hydrogen and liquid oxygen. It was also originally meant to be the third stage of a planned rocket called the C-4, hence the name S-IV.

Eleven companies submitted proposals for being the lead contractor on the stage by the deadline of 29 February 1960. NASA administrator T. Keith Glennan decided on 19 April that Douglas Aircraft Company would be awarded the contract. Convair had come in a close second but Glennan did not want to monopolize the liquid hydrogen-fueled rocket market as Convair was already building the Centaur stage of the Atlas-Centaur rocket.

In the end, the Marshall Space Flight Center decided to use the C-5 rocket (later called the Saturn V), which had three stages and would be topped with an uprated S-IV called the S-IVB featuring a single J-2 engine, as opposed to the cluster of 6 RL10 engines on the S-IV. Douglas was awarded the contract for the S-IVB because of the similarities between it and the S-IV. At the same time, it was decided to create the C-IB rocket (Saturn IB) that would also use the S-IVB as its second stage and could be used for testing the Apollo spacecraft in low Earth orbit.

Twelve 200-series and sixteen 500-series S-IVB stages were built, alongside three test stages. NASA was working on acquiring four additional 200-series stages (as part of four new Saturn IB rockets, SA-213 to 216), but funding never materialized and the order was canceled in August 1968 before S-IVB hardware was assembled. Similarly, an order for two additional 500-series stages (for Saturn V rockets 516 and 517) was canceled around the same time.

== Configuration ==
Douglas built two distinct versions of the S-IVB, the 200 series and the 500 series. The 200 series was used by the Saturn IB and differed from the 500 in that it did not have a flared interstage and it had less helium pressurization on board since it did not have to be restarted. In the 500 series, the interstage flared out to match the larger diameter of the S-II stage of the Saturn V. The 200 series also had three solid rockets for separating the S-IVB from the S-IB during staging. On the 500 series this was reduced to two, and two small Auxiliary Propulsion System (APS) thruster modules were added as ullage motors for restarting the J-2 engine and to provide attitude control during coast phases of flight.

The S-IVB carried 73,280 litres (19,360 US gal) of liquid oxygen (LOX), massing 87,200 kilograms (192,200 lb). It carried 252,750 litres (66,770 US gal) of liquid hydrogen (LH2), massing 18,000 kilograms (40,000 lb). Empty mass was 10,000 kilograms (22,000 lb)

=== Auxiliary Propulsion System ===
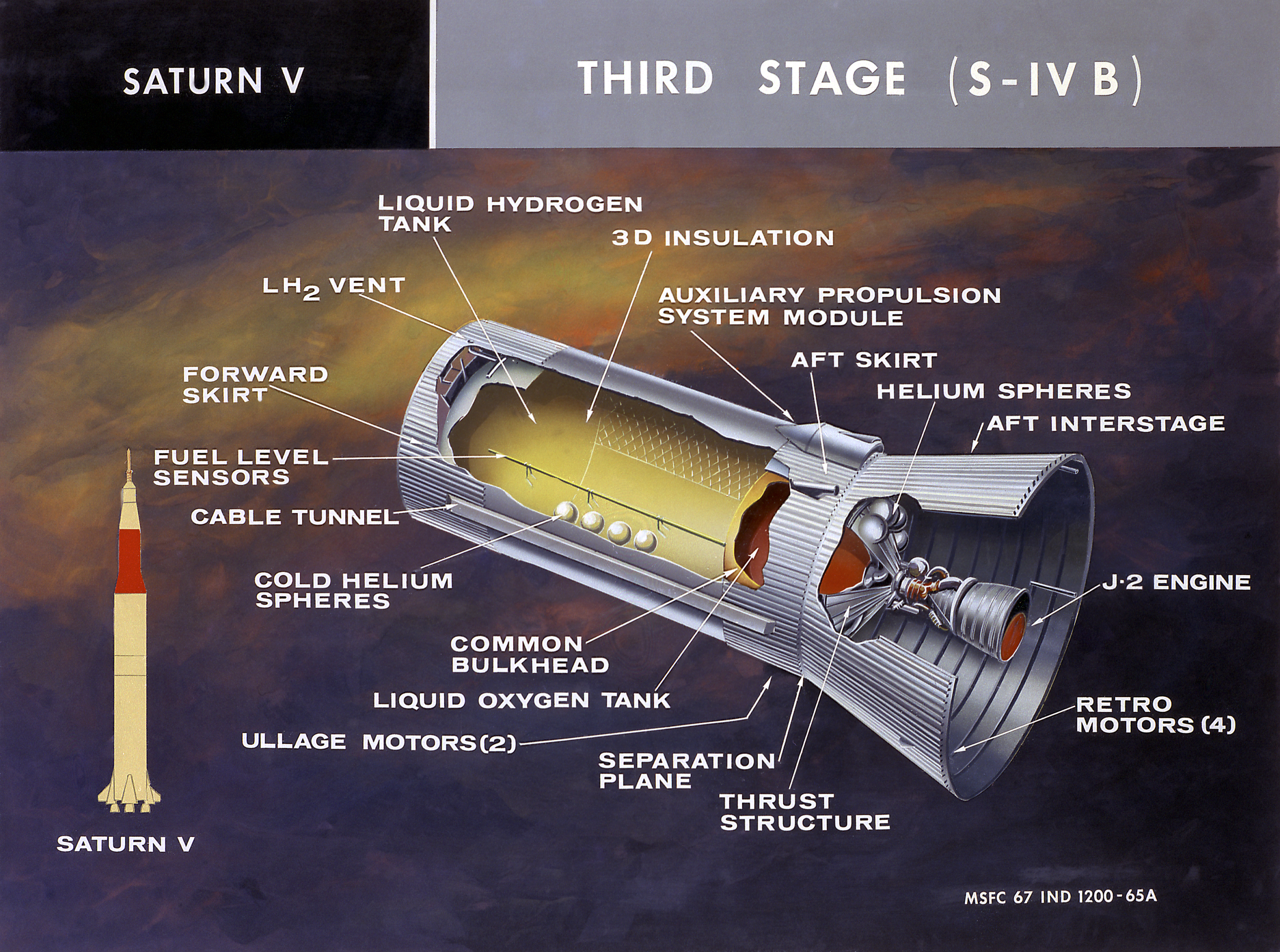
Cutaway drawing of the Saturn V S-IVB

Attitude control was provided by J-2 engine gimbaling during powered flight and by the two APS modules during coast. APS modules were used for three-axis control during coast phases, roll control during J-2 firings, and ullage for the second ignition of the J-2 engine. Each APS module contained two 150-pound-force (670 N) thrusters providing thrust for roll and pitch, another 150-pound-force thruster for yaw, and one 70-pound-force (310 N) thruster for ullage. Each module contained its own propellant tanks of 150 pounds (68 kg) dinitrogen tetroxide and 115 pounds (52 kg) monomethyl hydrazine as well as compressed helium to pressurize its propellants.

== Uses ==
A surplus S-IVB tank, serial number 212, was converted into the hull for Skylab, the first American space station. Skylab was launched on a Saturn V on May 14, 1973, and it eventually reentered the atmosphere on July 11, 1979. A second S-IVB, serial number 515, was also converted into a backup Skylab, but this one never flew.

From Apollo 13 onward, the S-IVB stages were crashed into the Moon to perform seismic measurements used for characterizing the lunar interior.

Stage-separation of S-IVB, internal mounted camera during AS-202

Stage-separation of S-IVB, ground-camera view during AS-202

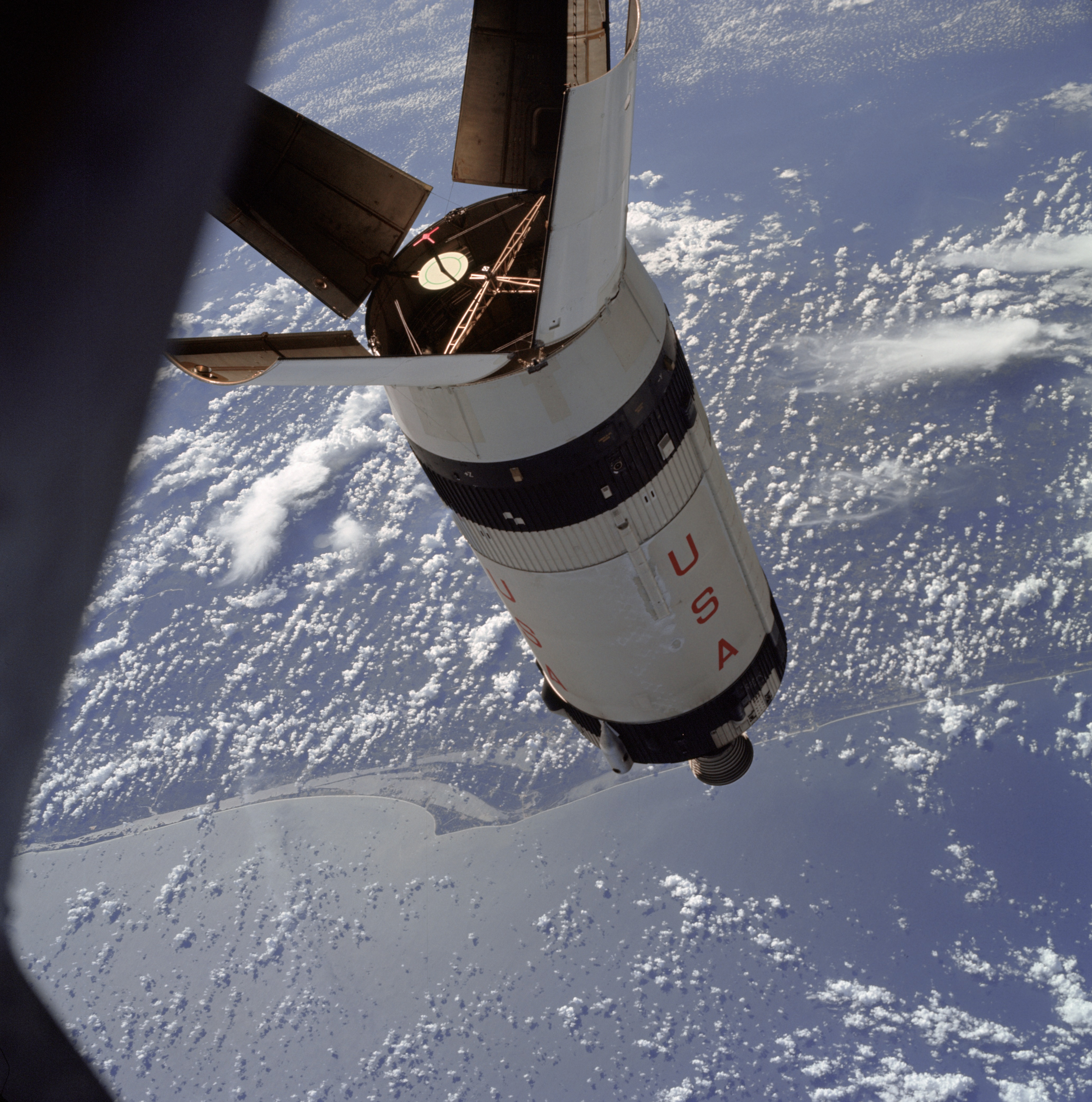
Apollo 7 S-IVB in orbit over Cape Canaveral

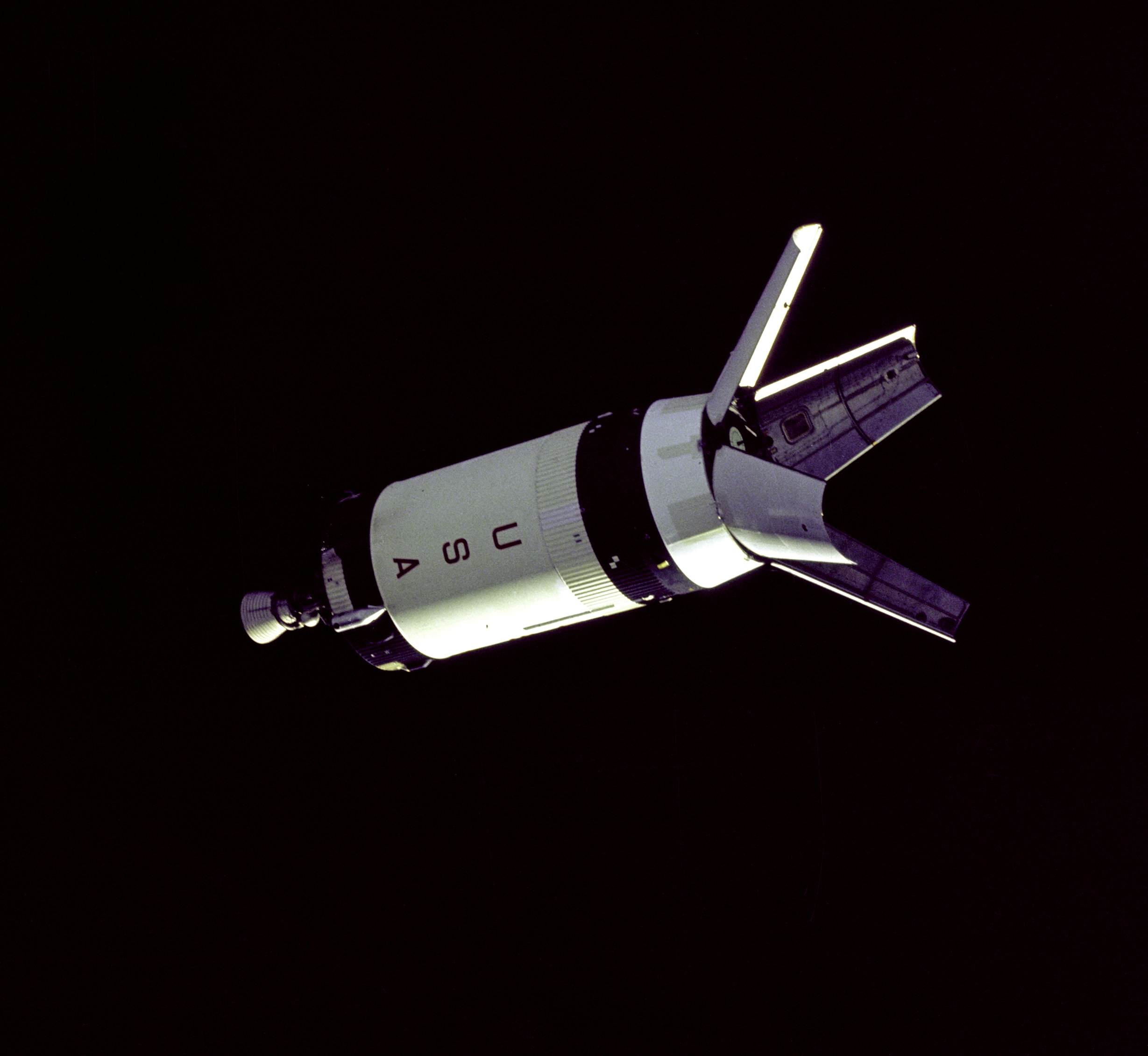
Distant view of Apollo 7 S-IVB stage

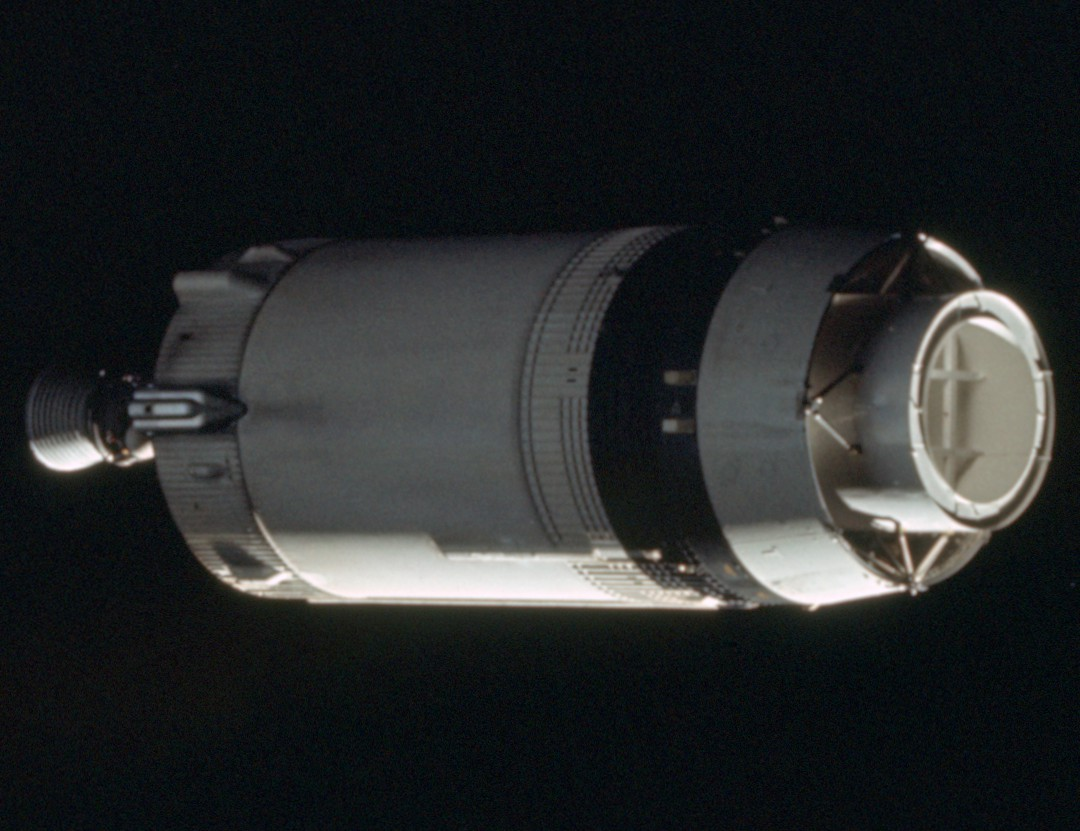
Apollo 8 S-IVB, shortly after separation

== Stages built ==
200 series
| Serial number | Use | Launch date | Current location | Notes | Image |
|---|---|---|---|---|---|
| S-IVB-S | "Battleship" static test stage | | Scrapped in 2024. Previously stacked on top of S-IB-11 at the Alabama Welcome Center in Ardmore, AL. | Test article made with thicker stainless steel tanks (flight stages would use thinner aluminum tanks) for early propellant loading and engine tests. Assembly completed in mid-1964, began testing in September of the same year. | |
| S-IVB-F | Facilities test stage | | Appears to have been scrapped in the 1990s | Completed in early 1965, used later that year (without J-2 engine) to check out ground facilities at LC-34 and LC-37 at Cape Canaveral. Completed similar testing as part of SA-500F at KSC in 1965/1966. Modified in 1970 to become Skylab Dynamic Test vehicle. | |
| S-IVB-D | "Dynamic" test stage | | U.S. Space & Rocket Center, Huntsville, Alabama | Assembly completed in 1964. Delivered to Marshall Space Flight Center in January 1965; also used for structural testing as part of SA-500D in 1967. | |
| S-IVB-T | Flight-weight test stage; Assembly cancelled | | | Would have featured flight-like aluminum tanks (unlike S-IVB-S) for final tanking and engine testing. Canceled during assembly, tanks were transferred to the S-IVB-F unit. | |
| S-IVB-201 | AS-201 | February 26, 1966 | Suborbital test; impacted Atlantic Ocean at 9.6621S, 10.0783E | First S-IVB to fly; suborbital Saturn IB mission. | |
| S-IVB-202 | AS-202 | August 25, 1966 | Suborbital test; impacted Atlantic Ocean | Suborbital Saturn IB mission; J-2 engine ignition recorded via a camera on S-IB stage. | |
| S-IVB-203 | AS-203 | July 5, 1966 | Exploded in orbit during bulkhead test at end of mission; debris decayed | Carried no payload in order to test the behavior of liquid hydrogen in weightlessness. Data used to validate J-2 restart possibility on 500-series S-IVB. | |
| S-IVB-204 | Apollo 5 (originally intended for Apollo 1) | January 22, 1968 | Launched LM-1 into low Earth orbit for uncrewed test; decayed | | |
| S-IVB-205 | Apollo 7 | October 11, 1968 | Decayed from low Earth orbit | | |
| S-IVB-206 | Skylab 2, (crew to Skylab) | May 25, 1973 | Decayed from low Earth orbit | First Saturn IB launched from LC-39B. Stages 206-210 were produced in 1966/67 then stored at Huntington Beach until 1971. Refurbished and put through a second set of ground testing prior to being shipped to KSC. | |
| S-IVB-207 | Skylab 3, (crew to Skylab) | July 28, 1973 | Decayed from low Earth orbit | | |
| S-IVB-208 | Skylab 4, (crew to Skylab) | November 16, 1973 | Decayed from low Earth orbit | | |
| S-IVB-209 | Unflown Skylab rescue vehicle | | Kennedy Space Center | Also acted as a backup vehicle for ASTP, never needed. | |
| S-IVB-210 | Apollo Soyuz Test Project | July 15, 1975 | Decayed from low Earth orbit | | |
| S-IVB-211 | Unused | | U.S. Space and Rocket Center, Huntsville, Alabama | Part of Skylab trainer. | |
| S-IVB-212 | Converted to Skylab | May 14, 1973 | Re-entered Earth's atmosphere on July 11, 1979 | | |
500 series
| Serial number | Use | Launch date | Current location | Notes | Image |
| S-IVB-501 | Apollo 4 | November 9, 1967 | Impacted Pacific Ocean at 23.435N, 161.207E. | First Saturn V flight test and first S-IVB to restart its J-2. Engine restart placed S-IVB and spacecraft on an Earth-intersecting trajectory. | |
| S-IVB-502 | Apollo 6 | April 4, 1968 | Decayed from low Earth orbit | Second uncrewed Saturn V flight test. J-2 restart failed due to damage from pogo oscillation of previous stages. Some mission milestones accomplished using additional burns of the Apollo Service Propulsion System (SPS). | |
| S-IVB-503 | Destroyed during testing | | | Originally intended for Apollo 8 prior to destruction | |
| S-IVB-503N | Apollo 8 | December 21, 1968 | Heliocentric orbit | | |
| S-IVB-504N | Apollo 9 | March 3, 1969 | Heliocentric orbit | | |
| S-IVB-505N | Apollo 10 | May 18, 1969 | Heliocentric orbit | | |
| S-IVB-506 | Apollo 11 | July 16, 1969 | Heliocentric orbit | | |
| S-IVB-507 | Apollo 12 | November 14, 1969 | Heliocentric orbit | Believed to have been discovered as an asteroid in 2002 and given the designation J002E3. | |
| S-IVB-508 | Apollo 13 | April 11, 1970 | Impacted lunar surface April 14, 1970* | | |
| S-IVB-509 | Apollo 14 | January 31, 1971 | Lunar surface* | | |
| S-IVB-510 | Apollo 15 | July 26, 1971 | Lunar surface* | | |
| S-IVB-511 | Apollo 16 | April 16, 1972 | Lunar surface* | | |
| S-IVB-512 | Apollo 17 | December 7, 1972 | Lunar surface* | | |
| S-IVB-513 | Apollo 18 (cancelled) | | Johnson Space Center | The other two stages of the SA-513 stack launched the Skylab space station to low Earth orbit. | |
| S-IVB-514 | Apollo 19 (cancelled) | | Kennedy Space Center | | |
| S-IVB-515 | Apollo 20 (cancelled), later converted to Skylab B | | National Air and Space Museum | Converted to Skylab B space station as a backup to Skylab. Proposed multiple times to be launched after Skylab, but funding never materialized and the station remained unused. | |

(* See List of artificial objects on the Moon for location.)

== Derivatives ==
The second stage of the Ares I rocket and the proposed Earth Departure Stage (EDS) would have had some of the characteristics of the S-IVB stage, as both would have had an uprated J-2 engine, called the J-2X, with the latter performing the same functions as that of the Series 500 version of the stage (placing the payload into orbit, and later firing the spacecraft into trans-lunar space).

The MS-IVB was a proposed modification of the S-IVB that would have been used on a Mars flyby, but it was never produced.

== See also ==
- S-IC
- S-II
- S-IV
- Saturn IB
- Saturn V
- Apollo (spacecraft)
- List of artificial objects on the Moon
