= Magnum (rocket) =

Proposed launch vehicle

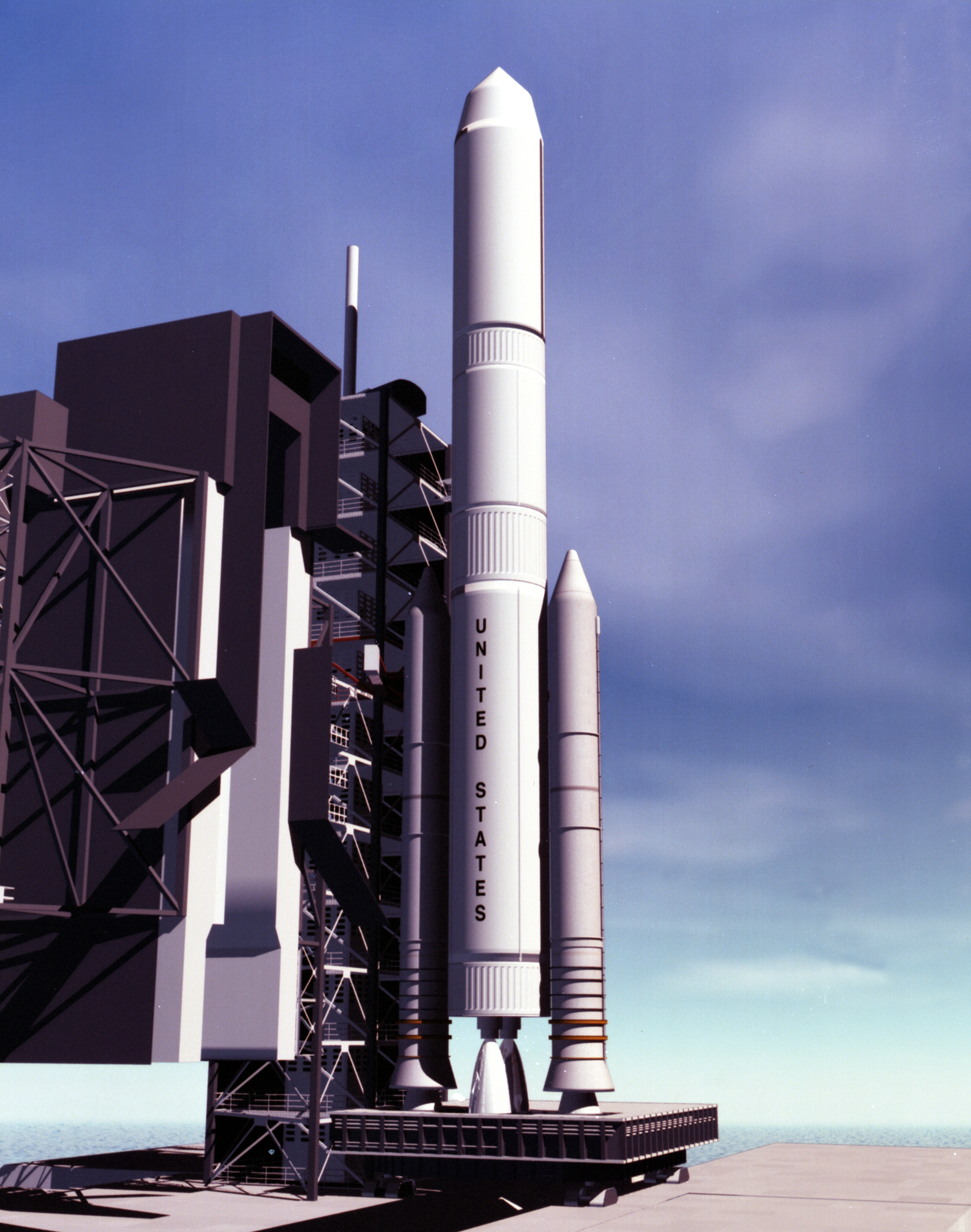
NASA illustration of Magnum booster.

The Magnum was a large super-heavy-lift rocket designed by NASA's Marshall Space Flight Center during the mid-1990s. The Magnum, which never made it past the preliminary design phase, would have been a launcher some 96 meters (315 feet) tall, on the scale of the Saturn V and was originally designed to carry a human expedition to Mars. It was to have used two strap-on side boosters, similar to the Space Shuttle Solid Rocket Boosters (SRBs), but using liquid fuel instead. Some designs had the strap-on boosters using wings and jet engines, which would enable them to fly back to the launch area after they were jettisoned in flight. The Magnum was designed to carry around 80 tons of payload into low Earth orbit (LEO).

== See also ==
- Shuttle-C
- Shuttle-derived vehicle
  - Shuttle-Derived Heavy Lift Launch Vehicle presented 2009
- National Launch System, studied from 1991 to 1993
- Constellation program, developed from 2005 to 2009 - cancelled
- Space Launch System, developed and built from 2010 onwards
- Studied Space Shuttle Variations and Derivatives
