= Shuttle-Derived Heavy Lift Launch Vehicle =

Space launch vehicle concept

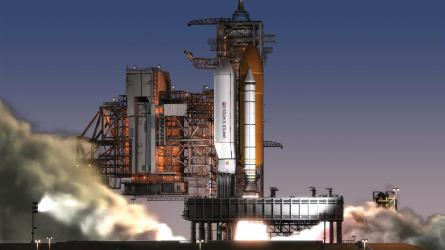
Artist impression of the Shuttle-Derived HLV concept

The Shuttle-Derived Heavy Lift Launch Vehicle ("HLV") was an alternate super heavy-lift launch vehicle proposal for the NASA Constellation program. It was first presented to the Augustine Commission on 17 June 2009.

Based on the Shuttle-C concept which has been the subject of various studies since the 1980s, the HLV was a Shuttle-Derived Launch Vehicle (SDLV) that proposed to replace the winged Orbiter from the Space Shuttle stack with a side-mounted payload carrier. The Space Shuttle's External Tank (ET) and four-segment Shuttle Solid Rocket Boosters (SRBs) would have remained the same.

According to initial estimates, the HLV could have been developed within 4 1/2 years for about US$6.6 billion, which was about 20% of the costs estimated for the Ares I and Ares V vehicle development.

== Origin ==
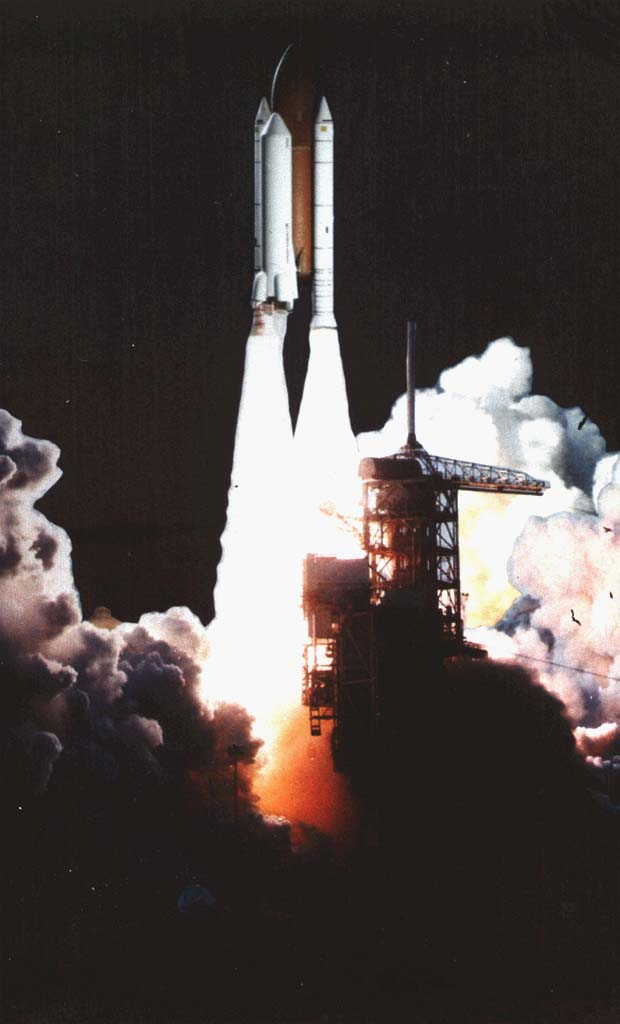
An artist's conception of a Shuttle-C launching at night

An uncrewed side-mounted concept of the Space Shuttle named Shuttle-C was investigated between 1984 and 1995. The Shuttle-C cargo only option was not funded in the 1980s and 1990s due to NASA's budgetary constraints. After the Space Shuttle Columbia disaster, a two-year industry study was prepared in 2004 and 2005 to further investigate the concept as a Shuttle replacement. The Exploration Systems Architecture Study (ESAS) in 2005 also investigated a Shuttle-C option for Project Constellation, again only in an uncrewed version. All these concepts intended the side-mounted carrier to be an autonomous spacecraft which would detach from the External Tank after main engine cut-off, similarly to the Space Shuttle. Some of the studies included the reuse of the Space Shuttle Main Engines on this side-mounted carrier. None of the concepts involved in-ascent fairing separation.

The HLV proposal presented on 17 June 2009 was partly based on the original Shuttle-C proposal. The main differences were that the side-mounted carrier could not detach from the ET, and proposing to also carry crews on the HLV. The proposal included work from about 60 NASA engineers.

== HLV specifications ==
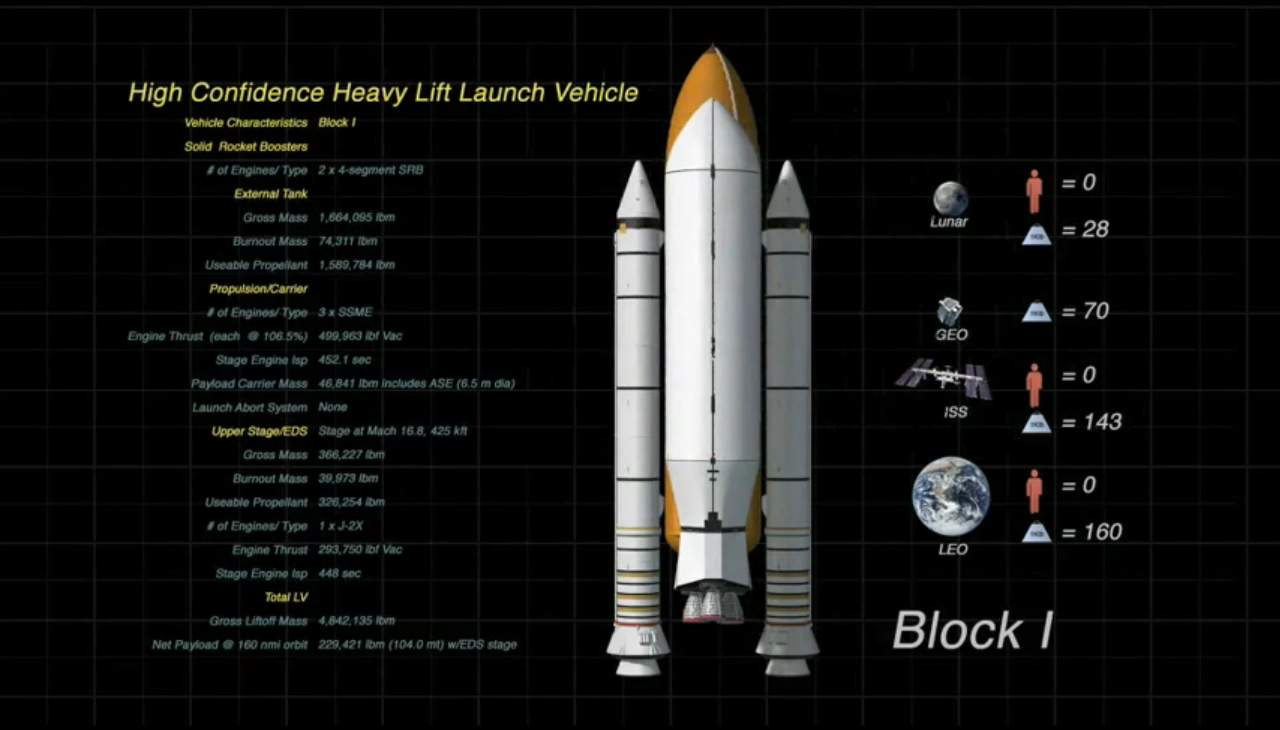
A diagram of the Shuttle-Derived Heavy Lift Launch Vehicle, Block I configuration

The HLV was proposed to be a 4,600,000 pounds (2,100,000 kg) vehicle at liftoff with two 4-segment Space Shuttle Solid Rocket Boosters weighing about 2,600,000 pounds (1,200,000 kg) providing a total thrust of 5,900,000 pounds-force (26 MN) at sea level and the Space Shuttle External Tank weighing about 1,660,000 pounds (750,000 kg) fueled.

The side-mounted carrier was to include a Shuttle-derived 'boattail' carrying the three Space Shuttle Main Engines and other propulsion elements. A 7.5 meters (25 ft) diameter payload carrier with a separable fairing weighing 51,000 pounds (23,000 kg) would take up the space usually occupied by the rest of the orbiter. The basic vehicle would not have an upper stage, requiring the payload to perform orbit circularization and possibly trans-lunar injection burns.

The only completely new hardware development to be required for the HLV was the side-mounted carrier. All other components used on the HLV were previously in use with the Space Shuttle, and up to the first six flights of the vehicle would have reused spare parts and salvaged functioning hardware from the orbiters, including existing avionics modules, flight software, and SSMEs (Block I flights). Virtually no change to the existing Space Shuttle infrastructure, from the Vehicle Assembly Building to the External Tank barge to the launch pads, was to be required.

=== Upper stage ===
To be usable for the envisioned lunar flights, the HLV would require an upper stage. The use of the J-2X engine that was under development for the Ares I launch vehicle was proposed for this upper stage. It would have provided nearly 300,000 pounds-force (1.3 MN) (vacuum) and was intended to have a specific impulse (Isp) of 448 sec.

Alternatively, the United Launch Alliance (ULA) proposed that their Dual Thrust Axis Lander (DTAL) could fit in a side mount payload shroud. The ULA ACE 41 and ACE 71 upper stage/fuel depot concepts could have also fitted inside a side mount payload shroud, and the ACE 71 at 75 metric tons (83 short tons) was well within the side mount shuttle derived vehicle's payload capacity.

=== Performance ===
The HLV's 4-segment SRBs were to deliver a specific impulse (Isp) of 267 sec and a thrust of 5,900,000 pounds-force (26 MN) and burn for about 155 seconds. The SSME main engines were to be flown at 104.5% and deliver a specific impulse (Isp) of 452 sec and 1,500,000 pounds-force (6.7 MN) (vacuum) and burn for about 500 seconds (depending on the mission profile). The payload mass for different missions was envisioned as follows:

- Block I vehicle without an upper stage – 79 metric tons (174,000 lb) (gross) and 71 metric tons (157,000 lb) (net) to a 120 nautical miles (220 km) × 120 nautical miles (220 km) reference orbit (28.5°) from Kennedy Space Center
- Block II cargo vehicle with an upper stage (mass of upper stage not included) – 90 metric tons (200,000 lb) (gross) and 81 metric tons (179,000 lb) (net) to a 120 nautical miles (220 km) × 120 nautical miles (220 km) reference orbit (28.5°) from Kennedy Space Center
- Block II crew vehicle with an upper stage (mass of upper stage not included) – 92 metric tons (203,000 lb) (gross) and 83 metric tons (183,000 lb) (net) to a 120 nautical miles (220 km) × 120 nautical miles (220 km) reference orbit (28.5°) from Kennedy Space Center
- Block II lunar missions: 39 metric tons (86,000 lb) to TLI (gross) with the lunar lander and 35 metric tons (77,000 lb) to TLI (net) from Kennedy Space Center.

=== Mission profile ===
In contrast to Shuttle-C, no part of the vehicle (except for the 4-segment SRBs) would have been recoverable and reusable. The HLV could have used a different flight profile than Shuttle because of a lack of wings and associated load limits. The payload fairing 23,000 pounds (10,000 kg) was to be jettisoned 185 seconds into the flight at about 57 nautical miles (106 km) altitude. The SSME main engines were not to be reused and thus could be simplified, and new engines would have to be produced for each vehicle. For lunar missions, the HLV proposal envisioned suborbital staging at 30 nautical miles (56 km) × 120 nautical miles (220 km) of the vehicle to increase mass through TLI (trans-lunar injection) with two burns of the upper stage (a suborbital burn and an additional TLI burn).

== Lunar mission architecture ==
Lunar mission scenario with the HLV, a lunar lander and the Orion spacecraft

While the HLV was designed to provide crew and cargo missions to the ISS, its primary aim would have been to replace the Ares I – Ares V lunar architecture. The rudimentary mission architecture used a Lunar Orbit Rendezvous profile. Two HLVs were to be launched for the completion of one mission. The first HLV was to be launched with the lunar lander and immediately place the lunar lander on a trans-lunar injection. The lunar lander would have had a net mass of 35 metric tons after TLI, and would have inserted itself into a low lunar orbit (LLO). In LLO, the lunar lander would weigh about 28 metric tons.

The second HLV was to place an Orion spacecraft and crew to trans-lunar injection. The 20 metric ton Orion spacecraft would remain attached to the upper stage, which was to insert the Orion spacecraft into LLO and dock with the lunar lander.

== Growth options ==
The HLV would have had limited growth option. While 5-segment SRBs could have been used on the vehicle, they would have required significant re-engineering to yield 7 metric tons more to lower Earth orbit. Other growth options included an upgrade of the SSME to 106% or 109% thrust level or a switch from the J-2X upper engine to an air-startable SSME.

== See also ==
- Jupiter (rocket family)
- Magnum (rocket), a 1990s Shuttle-derived heavy lift vehicle concept.
- Review of United States Human Space Flight Plans Committee
