= DIRECT & Jupiter Rocket Family =

Proposed family of US super heavy-lift launch vehicles

Jupiter
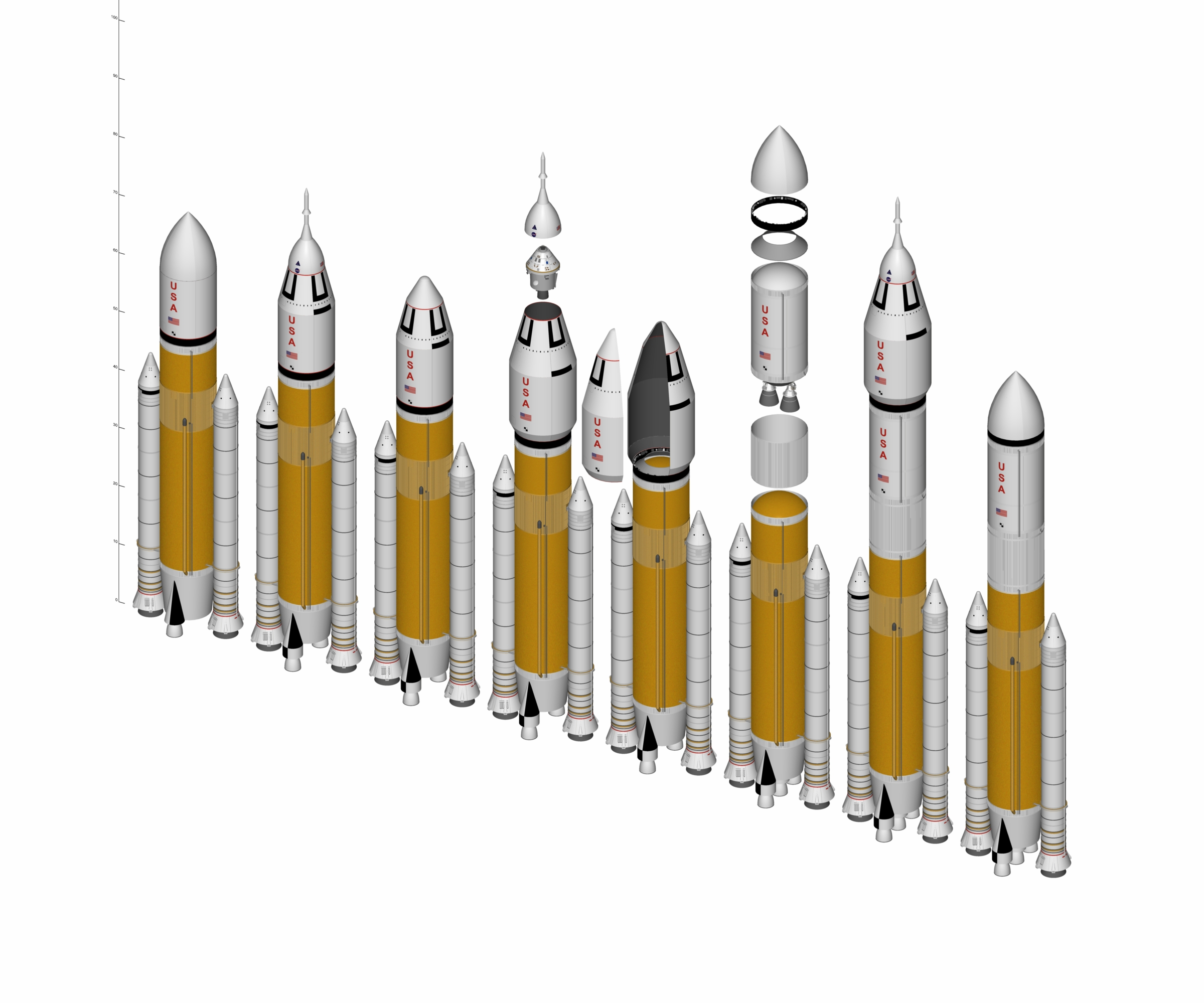
- The Jupiter common core stage would have used Shuttle components
- Function: Crewed launch vehicle
- Country of origin: United States

Size
- Height: 70.9–92.3 m (233–303 ft)
- Diameter: 8.41 m (27.6 ft)
- Mass: 2,061,689–2,177,650 kg (4,545,246–4,800,896 lb)
- Stages: 1.5 or 2

Capacity

Payload to LEO (185 km x 51.6°)
- Mass: 60,282 kg (132,899 lb) (Jupiter-130)

Payload to LEO (241 km x 29°)
- Mass: 91,670 kg (202,100 lb) (Jupiter-246)

Associated rockets
- Family: SDLV
- Comparable: National Launch System

Launch history
- Status: Rejected Proposal
- Launch sites: LC-39B, Kennedy Space Center
- Carries passengers or cargo: Orion Crew Exploration Vehicle; Altair Lunar Surface Access Module

Boosters – Shuttle RSRM
- No. boosters: 2
- Powered by: 1 solid
- Maximum thrust: 12,868–13,977 kN (2,893,000–3,142,000 lbf) (sea level - vacuum)
- Total thrust: 25,737–27,955 kN (5,786,000–6,285,000 lbf) (sea level - vacuum)
- Specific impulse: 237.0 - 269.1 sec (sea level - vacuum)
- Burn time: 123.8 sec
- Propellant: APCP/PBAN

First stage (Jupiter-130) – Common core stage
- Diameter: 8.41 m (27.6 ft)
- Powered by: 3 SSME-Block-II
- Maximum thrust: 5,235–6,550 kN (1,177,000–1,472,000 lbf) (sea level - vacuum; three engines combined)
- Specific impulse: 361.4 - 452.2 sec (sea level - vacuum)
- Burn time: 524.5 sec
- Propellant: LOX/LH2

First stage (Jupiter-246) – Common core stage
- Diameter: 8.41 m (27.6 ft)
- Powered by: 4 SSME-Block-II
- Maximum thrust: 6,981–8,734 kN (1,569,000–1,963,000 lbf) (sea level - vacuum)
- Specific impulse: 361.4 (SL); 452.2 sec (sea level - vacuum)
- Burn time: 384.1 sec
- Propellant: LOX/LH2

Second stage (Jupiter-246) – Jupiter Upper Stage
- Diameter: 8.41 m (27.6 ft)
- Powered by: 6 RL10B-2
- Maximum thrust: 661 kN (149,000 lbf) (vacuum)
- Specific impulse: 459 sec (vacuum)
- Burn time: 609.9 sec
- Propellant: LOX/LH2

DIRECT was a late-2000s proposed alternative super heavy lift launch vehicle architecture supporting NASA's Vision for Space Exploration that would replace the space agency's planned Ares I and Ares V rockets with a family of Shuttle-Derived Launch Vehicles named "Jupiter". It was intended to be the alternative to the Ares I and Ares V rockets which were under development for the Constellation program, intended to develop the Orion spacecraft for use in Earth orbit, the Moon, and Mars.

Major benefits were projected from re-using as much hardware and facilities from the Space Shuttle program as possible, including cost savings, experience with existing hardware, and preserving the workforce.

== DIRECT proposal ==
DIRECT was a late-2000s proposed alternative super heavy lift launch vehicle architecture supporting NASA's Vision for Space Exploration that would replace the space agency's planned Ares I and Ares V rockets with a family of Shuttle-Derived Launch Vehicles named "Jupiter".

DIRECT was advocated by a group of space enthusiasts who asserted that they represented a broader team of dozens of NASA and space industry engineers who actively worked on the proposal on an anonymous, voluntary basis in their spare time. In September 2008, the DIRECT Team was said to consist of 69 members, 62 of whom were NASA engineers, NASA-contractor engineers, and managers from the Constellation Program. The small number of non-NASA members of the team publicly represented the group.

The project name "DIRECT" referred to a philosophy of maximizing the re-use of hardware and facilities already in place for the Space Shuttle program (STS), hence a "direct" transition. The DIRECT Team asserted that using this approach to develop and operate a family of high-commonality rockets would reduce costs and the gap between retirement of the Space Shuttle and the first launch of Orion, shorten schedules, and simplify technical requirements for future US human space efforts.

Three major versions of the DIRECT proposal were released with the last, Version 3.0, unveiled in May 2009. On 17 June 2009, the group presented its proposal at a public hearing of the Review of U.S. Human Space Flight Plans Committee, a panel reviewing US space efforts, in Washington D.C.

With the October 11th signing of the NASA Authorization Act of 2010 (S. 3729) by President Obama mandating work on the Space Launch System Heavy Lift Launch Vehicle, the DIRECT Team declared their effort a success and disbanded.

=== Jupiter launch vehicle family ===
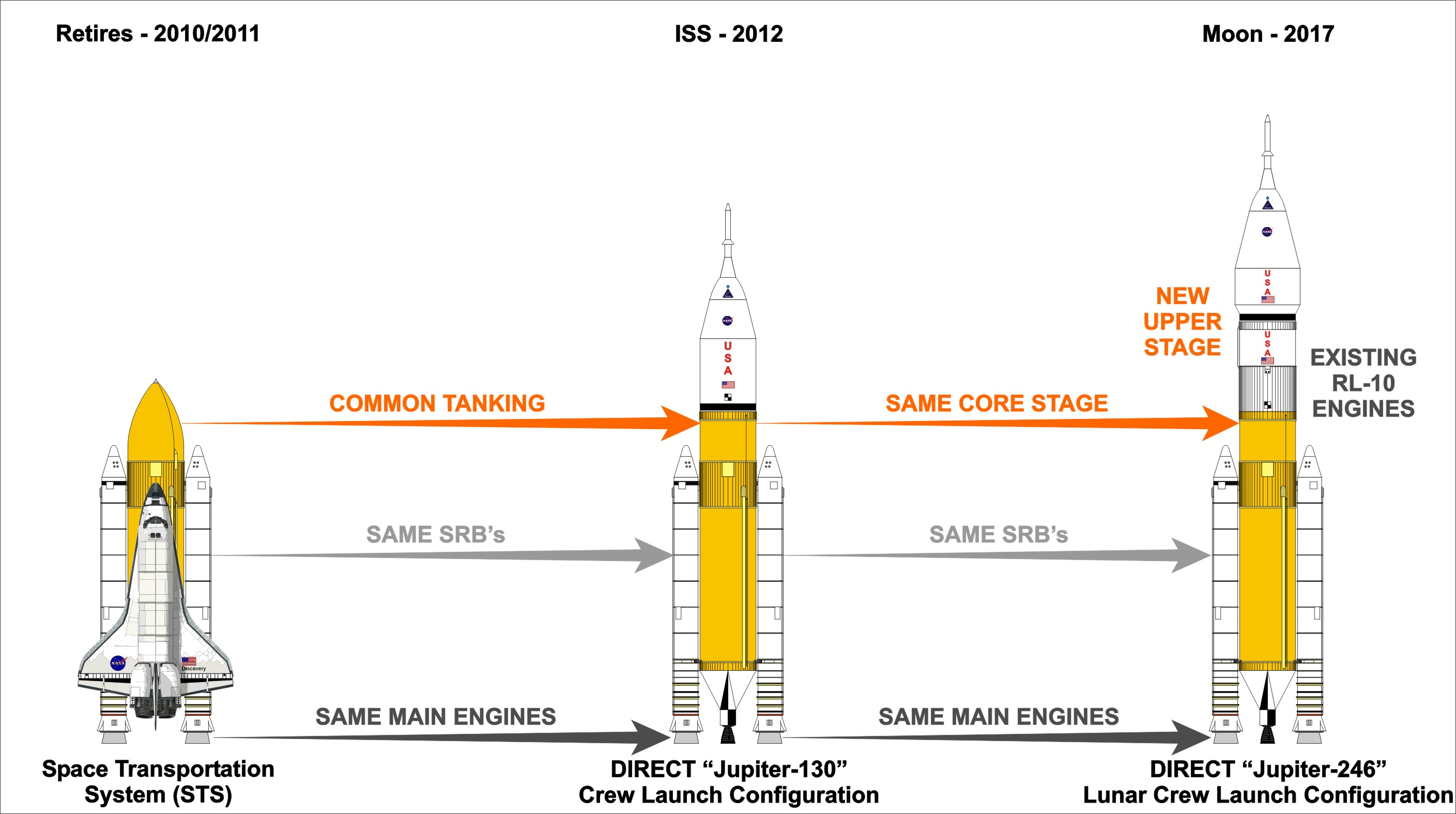
The Commonality of DIRECT and the shuttle

DIRECT advocated developing a single, high-commonality family of rockets named Jupiter, adapted closely from existing Space Shuttle systems. Each Jupiter launch vehicle would use a "common core stage" consisting of a tank structure based closely on the existing Space Shuttle External Tank with a pair of standard four-segment Solid Rocket Boosters (SRBs) mounted at the sides as on the Space Shuttle. Up to four Space Shuttle Main Engines (SSMEs) from the Space Shuttle Orbiter would be attached to the bottom of the External Tank. The engines would be deorbited along with the expended tank to burn up in the Earth's atmosphere.

Crews would be carried atop the launch vehicle in NASA's planned Orion Crew Exploration Vehicle, itself topped by the planned Launch Abort System. Cargo, whether carried behind the Orion spacecraft or alone on a cargo-only launch would be enclosed by a payload fairing.

Many configurations of Jupiter were seen as possible, but the DIRECT version 3.0 proposal, released in May 2009, recommended two: the Jupiter-130 and Jupiter-246, with claimed lift capacities exceeding 70 and 110 tonnes, respectively, to low Earth orbit.

=== Proposed and Possible Missions ===
==== Low Earth Orbit and Uncrewed Scientific Missions ====
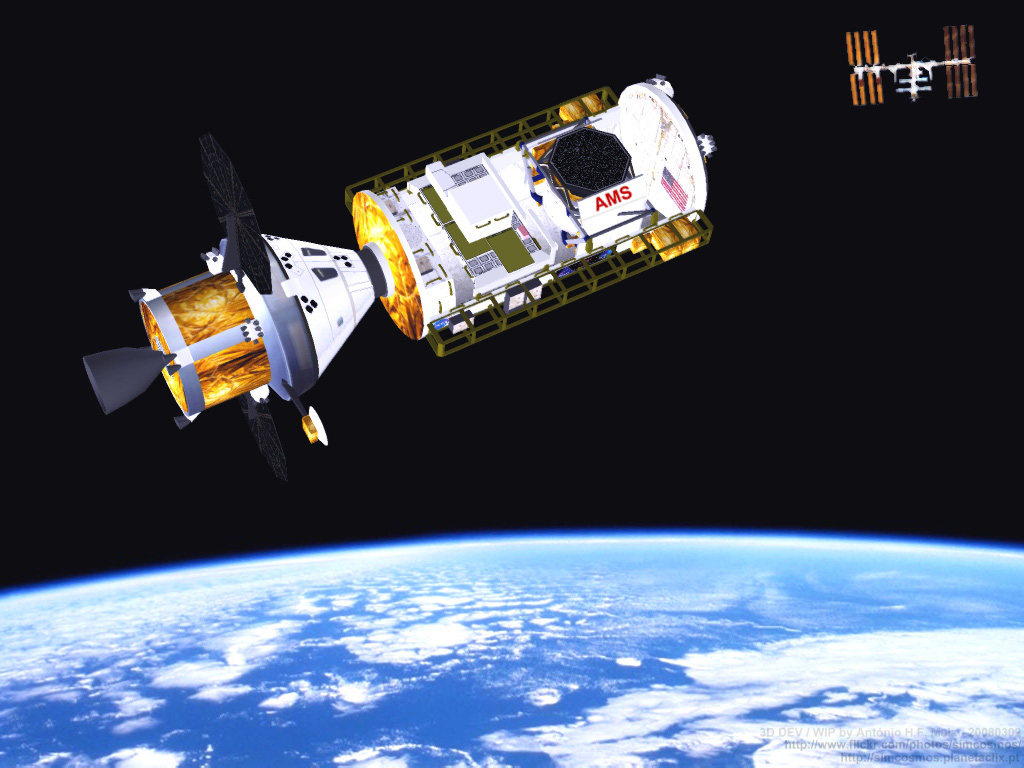
Orion spacecraft taking a Space Shuttle Payload Delivery Module (SSPDM) to the ISS, carrying an airlock, the Alpha Magnetic Spectrometer and other cargo on a single Jupiter-130. (Artist's conception)

DIRECT asserted that the extra payload capability of the Jupiter-130 would allow for a range of additional cargo payloads to be flown with each Orion crew, a capability which is not possible with the Ares I. The team suggested a number of extra missions which would be enabled by Jupiter in their proposal, including:

- New ISS resupply missions with the three ESA/ASI-built Multi-Purpose Logistics Modules
- Performing more Hubble Space Telescope Servicing Missions with Orion crews
- Launching massive new space telescopes over 8 meters in diameter (more than 3 times the diameter of Hubble)
- Perform a Mars Sample Return mission on a single Jupiter launcher, to land on Mars and return a sample of its soil back to Earth for study as early as 2013
- Launching a human crew to fly around the moon as early as 2013

The DIRECT team asserted that these additional new missions could have been planned and funded due to development cost savings with the Jupiter rocket family compared to the current NASA baseline. They suggested that the proposed new missions and payloads could provide useful employment for many people who were working in the Space Shuttle program.

==== Lunar Mission Architecture ====
As with NASA's Constellation Program baseline, two launches would be performed for a DIRECT lunar mission. One Jupiter-246 rocket would carry the crew in NASA's planned Orion Crew Exploration Vehicle along with NASA's planned Lunar Surface Access Module lunar lander. Another Jupiter-246 would be launched, its Jupiter Upper Stage (JUS) fully fueled with no payload. This particular JUS would serve as the Earth Departure Stage. The two upper stages would meet in low Earth orbit and the lunar spacecraft would transfer from the spent JUS to the fresh JUS. The assembled Orion/Altair/JUS would leave Earth orbit for the Moon. The spacecraft would enter lunar orbit, and the entire crew would descend to the Moon in the Altair while the Orion remained in lunar orbit.

DIRECT calculated that the two Jupiter-246s will be able to send 80.7 t of mass through trans-lunar injection. This compared favorably with an Ares I / Ares V dual launch, as of September 2008, projected to be capable of 71.1 t.

== Origins and history ==
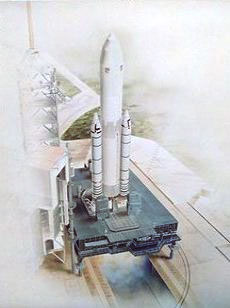
1978 image of a Morton Thiokol-proposed In-Line Shuttle Derived launch vehicle. Note painted tank.

DIRECT's Jupiter vehicle would have been an "in-line" Space Shuttle-derived launch vehicle. This broad category of Space Shuttle adaptations, postulated since before the first Shuttle launch, removes the winged Space Shuttle Orbiter, moves the liquid main engines to the bottom of the cryogenic tankage (typically proposed to be adapted from the Shuttle external tank), and relocates the payload to above the tankage.

The first official study of the concept was conducted in 1986 by NASA's Marshall Space Flight Center in the aftermath of the Space Shuttle Challenger disaster. It was promoted as one of the alternatives for launching uncrewed cargo and would have potentially allowed a restarted lunar program as well. There were, however, no funds available to NASA for building any new vehicles while the Space Shuttle program continued. The idea was shelved and NASA concentrated on fixing and operating the Space Shuttle instead.

DIRECT's approach had a resemblance to that of the 1991 National Launch System effort. Proposed jointly by NASA and the Department of Defense as an alternative to the Titan IV, the design was based on the same solid rocket boosters and modified external tank, but instead of the reusable Space Shuttle main engine, specified four of the proposed disposable, less expensive Space Transportation Main Engines. The United States Congress did not appropriate funding for the development. A great deal of reference material exists in the public domain regarding NLS.

NASA's Exploration Systems Architecture Study (ESAS) of 2005 included a similar design to the DIRECT proposal using three Space Shuttle Main Engines (SSME). Known as LV-24 in crew launch form, and LV-25 in cargo configuration, the idea was dismissed because it did not have sufficient performance for the proposed lunar program - however the concept was not considered using an Earth departure stage (EDS).

DIRECT's re-exploration of the SDLV idea began in 2006 in frustration with the high cost and delays of Ares I and worries that any similar issues with the giant Ares V might put the whole Constellation Program in jeopardy. An additional goal was to maintain US ability to launch crews to space with as short a gap as possible after the planned retirement of Shuttle.

=== DIRECT v1.0 ===
According to the DIRECT team, the first version of the DIRECT proposal was the product of a three-month study produced by more than a dozen NASA engineers and managers working in their free time, and a small group of engineers and non-engineers outside NASA. DIRECT took the final ESAS recommendation of using the EDS during the ascent phase of the flight to gain additional launch performance on the Cargo LV, and applied this same methodology to the LV-24/25.

The next change in DIRECT's development was in response to NASA dropping the Space Shuttle Main Engine on the Ares V design due to the high manufacturing cost of the SSME engines and the difficulty in producing the required number of units per year with existing manufacturing facilities. NASA specified five RS-68 engines as the core engines for Ares V. The DIRECT proposal specified that its core should include two RS-68 engines. Additional performance for carrying payloads to Low Earth Orbit would be provided by upgrading the main engines with Regenerative Cooling Nozzles to improve their efficiency.

The v1.0 proposal was submitted on October 25, 2006, to NASA's administrator, Michael D. Griffin, and a wide range of industry, political and advocacy groups involved in the Constellation program.

=== Criticism of v1.0 ===
In late 2006, the head of the ESAS Study, Dr. Doug Stanley, declared that the DIRECT v1.0 proposal could not work as it relied on overly optimistic and speculative performance specifications for an upgraded RS-68 Regen engine. Stanley produced official specifications from Rocketdyne about the RS-68 Regen upgrades as evidence for his point.

=== DIRECT v2.0 ===
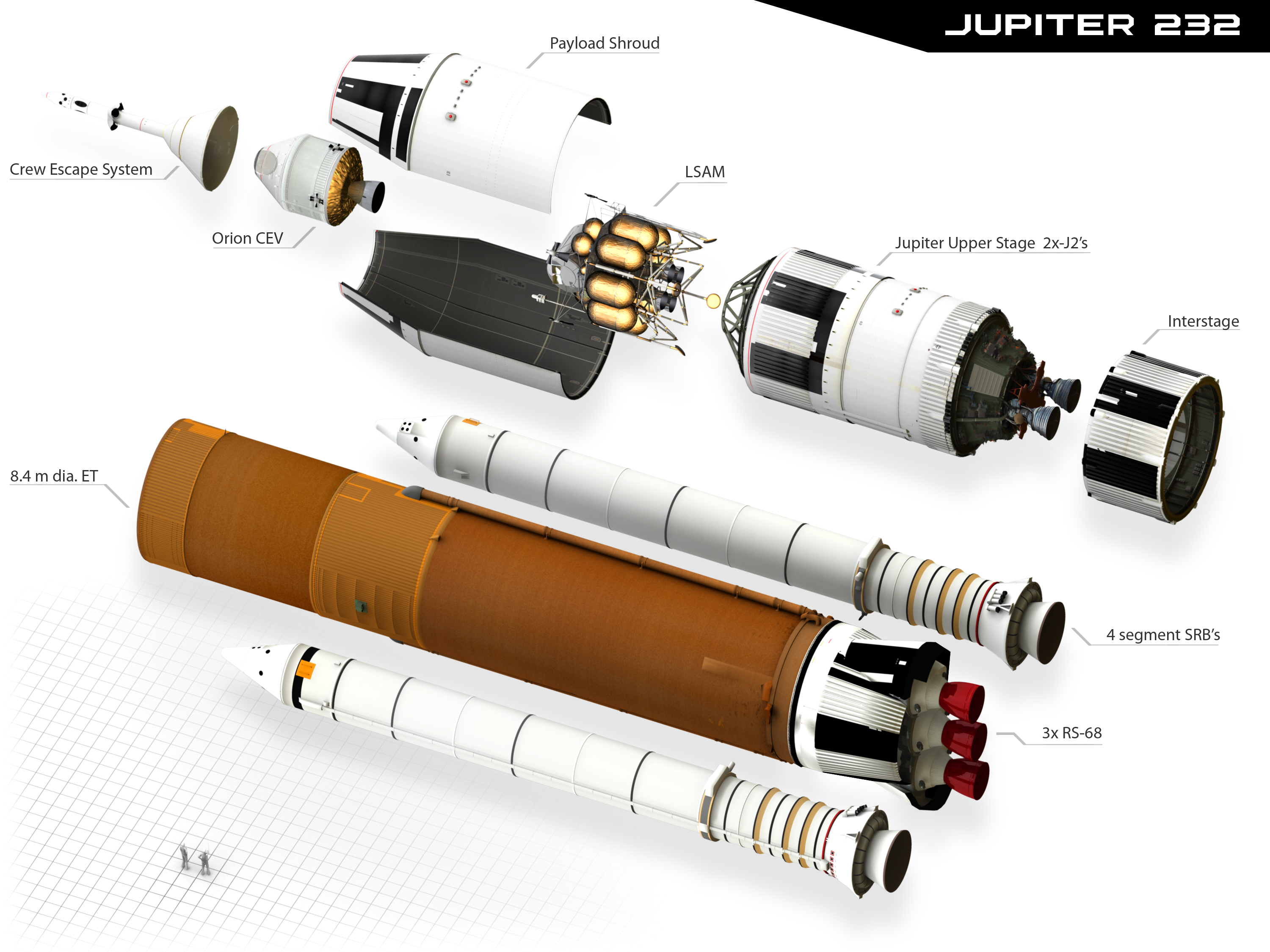
Expanded diagram of the DIRECT v2.0 Jupiter-232 configuration

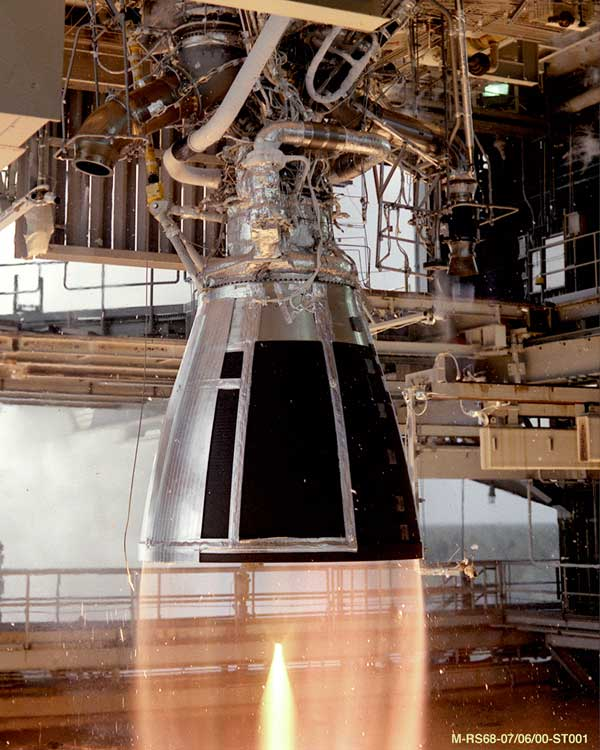
Direct v2.0 proposed to use a human-rated version of the existing RS-68 engine design.

On May 10, 2007, a revised DIRECT proposal was released. To address criticism of relying on engine studies rather than working engines, DIRECT v2.0 specified human-rating the standard performance RS-68 as used on existing Delta IV launchers and for the upper stage chose the lower of two specifications of J-2X engine which Rocketdyne was developing for NASA's Ares launchers. DIRECT v2.0 introduced a scalable, modular family of Shuttle-derived launch vehicles, starting with the Jupiter-120 and Jupiter-232.

According to the proposal, the single-stage Jupiter-120 could achieve low Earth orbit with two standard ablative RS-68 engines, while an extra RS-68 was required on the core stage of the heavier two-stage Jupiter-232. The Earth Departure Stage for Jupiter-232 now required two standard J-2X engines instead of one.

The DIRECT team produced a 131-page DIRECT v2.0 exploration architecture study that was released on September 19, 2007, at the AIAA "Space 2007" Conference in Long Beach, California. According to the group, this paper was created within a nine-month study. The paper provided detail on how the launch vehicles would be one component of a wider-reaching architecture for enabling the US to maintain the International Space Station (ISS), fly lunar missions, and provide additional capabilities for the NASA human spaceflight program. These capabilities included missions to Mars, Lagrangian point staging architecture options, and mission architectures for visiting Near-Earth object destinations.

=== Criticism and Rebuttal of v2.0 ===
In June 2008, David King, director of NASA's Marshall Space Flight Center stated that NASA has considered DIRECT as well as many other rocket proposals, and that the Ares family was the right set of rockets for the mission. "DIRECT v2.0 falls significantly short of the lunar lander performance requirement for exploration missions as specifically outlined in Constellation Program ground rules. The concept also overshoots the requirements for early missions to the International Space Station in the coming decade. These shortcomings would necessitate rushed development of a more expensive launch system with too little capability in the long run, and would actually increase the gap between space shuttle retirement and development of a new vehicle. Even more importantly, the Ares approach offers a much greater margin of crew safety - paramount to every mission NASA puts into space."

In July 2008, following NASA statements of no special studies on DIRECT, the space agency released some internal studies conducted in 2006 and 2007. Nearly a year later, on 18 May 2009, the DIRECT team released a rebuttal to the charges raised by NASA, concluding that "significant flaws in the evaluation of DIRECT" rendered the October 2007 analysis useless.

=== DIRECT v3.0 ===
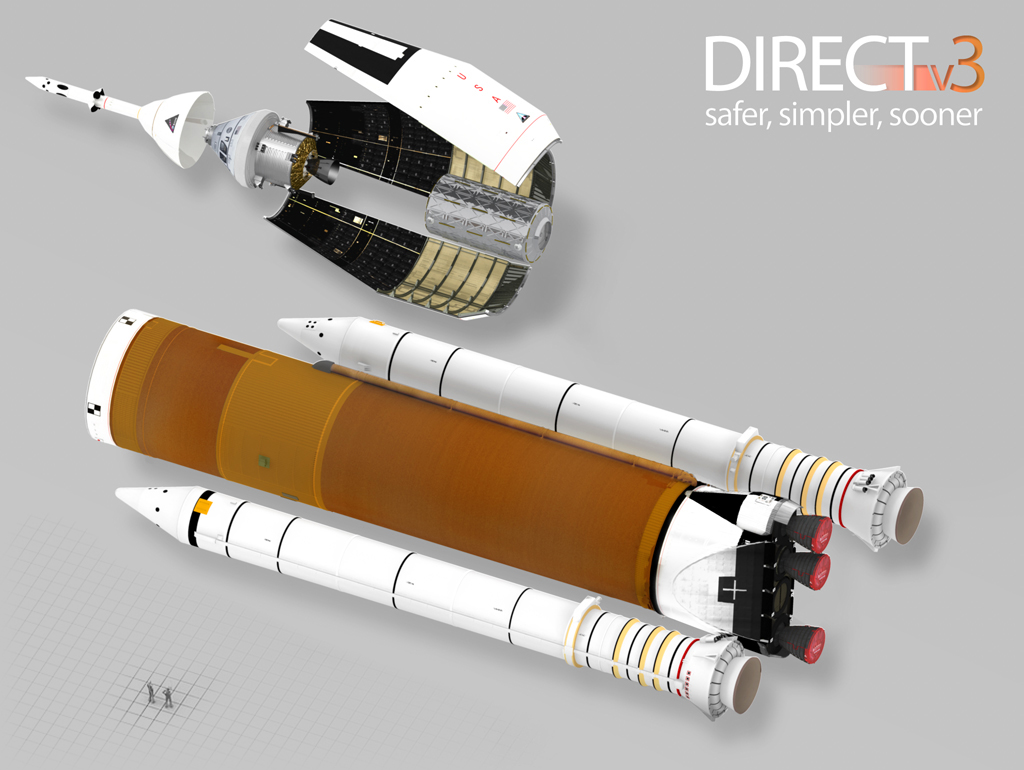
Expanded diagram of the DIRECT v3.0 Jupiter-130 configuration

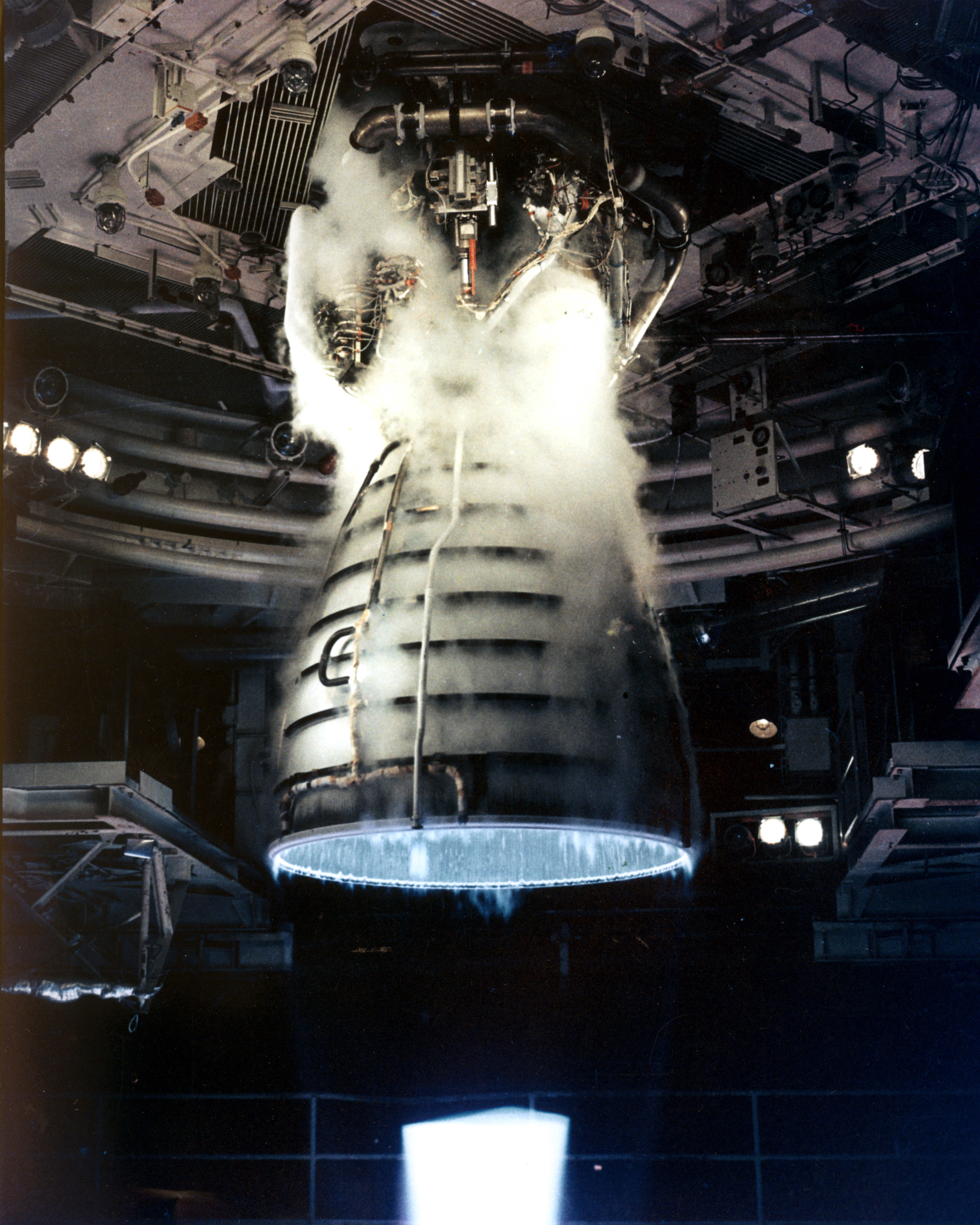
To save development time and costs, Direct v3.0 proposed to use "off the shelf" Space Shuttle Main Engines which were already human-rated.

On 29 May 2009, DIRECT spokesperson Stephen Metschan gave a presentation to the 28th Annual International Space Development Conference in Orlando, Florida entitled, "Direct 3.0: Landing Twice the Mass on the Moon at Half the Cost." In April 2009, following NASA trade studies comparing use of the Space Shuttle Main Engine (SSME) to the originally planned RS-68 engine for Ares V, the DIRECT Team announced that future DIRECT proposals would recommend SSME as the core-stage engine. The engine change was due to concerns that the ablatively-cooled RS-68 would not survive the intense heat produced by the nearby exhaust plumes of the Space Shuttle SRBs. DIRECT asserts that the higher cost of the regeneratively cooled SSME will be offset by the time and money saved by not human-rating the RS-68. Similarly, for the upper stage, the DIRECT Team recommended using six of the flight-proven RL10B-2 engine.

In May 2009 the Office of Science and Technology Policy announced the Review of United States Human Space Flight Plans Committee to be chaired by Norman R. Augustine. On 17 June 2009, team member Stephen Metschan presented the DIRECT v3.0 concept to the committee, which was formed to offer independent advice to the incoming Obama Administration. The committee's final report did not directly compare DIRECT to the Constellation Program, but did offer budget, schedule, and mission combinations where a shuttle-derived launch vehicle could be used.

On 19 January 2010, amid rumors that NASA would propose a DIRECT-like inline launch vehicle, the DIRECT team made a presentation to NASA Associate Administrator for Exploration Systems Mission Directorate, Douglas Cooke, and NASA Associate Administrator for Space Operations, William H. Gerstenmaier, in a meeting convened by NASA Administrator Charles F. Bolden, Jr.

== Integrated Approach - reuse existing facilities ==
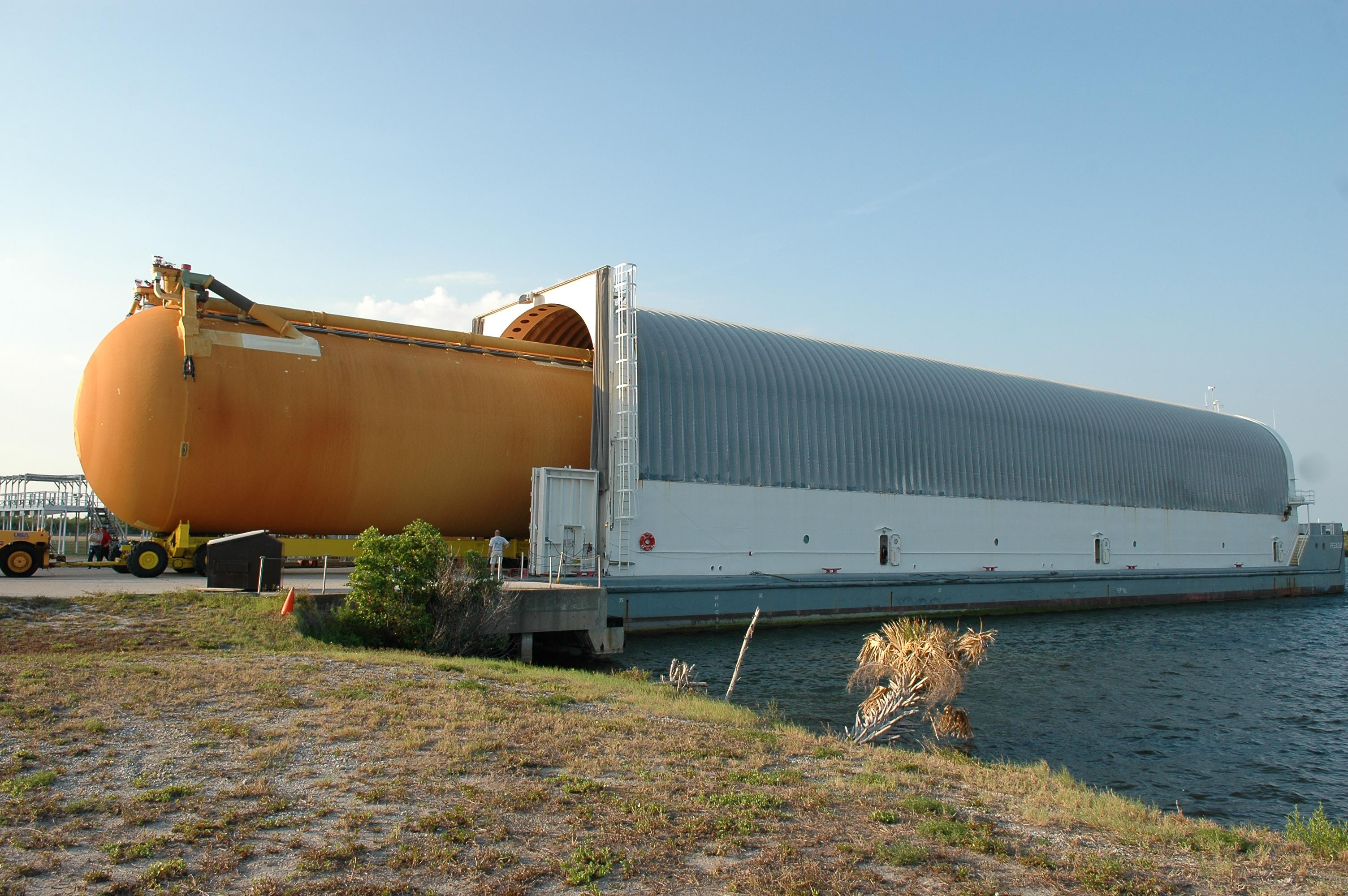
Pegasus barge delivers a Space Shuttle External Tank to the Vehicle Assembly Building at Kennedy Space Center in Florida from the Michoud Assembly Facility in Louisiana. DIRECT would use the existing barge to transport its planned similar tank from Michoud.

According to the DIRECT team, many NASA engineers and managers supported the concept and completed a cost analysis comparison with NASA's current Constellation program and a detailed series of evaluations for supporting facilities such as data on the existing manufacturing facilities for the External Tank at the Michoud Assembly Facility and the various launch-processing facilities currently at the Kennedy Space Center. DIRECT proposed to re-use nearly all of the existing facilities with minimal modifications in contrast to the Ares I and Ares V rockets which would have required extensive modifications and replacements over existing facilities.

The DIRECT's core stage would have remained at the existing 8.41 m (27.6 ft) diameter of the Shuttle's External Tank compared to 10.06 m (33.0 ft) for Ares V. The DIRECT team claimed that by not increasing the core stage diameter the existing External Tank manufacturing tooling at the Michoud Assembly Facility, the existing Pegasus barge used to transport the tank from Michoud to Kennedy Space Center, the existing work platforms in the Vehicle Assembly Building, the existing Mobile Launcher Platforms and Crawler-Transporters, and parts of the structure of the existing Fixed Service Structure and Flame Trenches at Launch Complex 39 could be used without major modifications.

The Space Launch System, NASA's eventual successor to Ares, retained the Space Shuttle tankage diameter of 8.41 m (27.6 ft).

== Ares I/Ares V Cost and Schedule vs. DIRECT ==
=== Ares I/V Costs ===
One of the strongest programmatic criticisms with the Ares I and Ares V architecture was the high cost for both developing two new launchers and for operating two concurrent programs. The cost concerns were cited in GAO Reports to Congress noting that the Ares I alone was expected to cost up to $14.4 billion to develop. Former NASA Administrator Michael D. Griffin confirmed that the total cost for developing both Ares launchers would be $32 billion, indicating that the Ares V would be more expensive to develop than the Ares I.

=== Ares I Schedule ===
The schedule for Ares I incurred several delays since the inception of the new lunar program. The original intent in the Exploration Systems Architecture Study (ESAS) Report was to have a crewed flight as early as mid-2011 after the Space Shuttle retirement in 2010. A subsequent official NASA schedule had a 65% confidence that the first crewed flight of Ares I with Orion (Orion 2) would occur in March 2015.

A critical activity of Ares I development was the schedule for the J-2X upper stage engine and the five-segment version of the SRB. Engineers were concerned about thrust oscillation and Orion-Ares I integration. In 2008, Lockheed Martin requested that NASA redesign Ares I in order to end integration risks with the Orion crew capsule. The combined test results from the Ares I-X launch and the Ares I static test firing indicated that thrust oscillation was not a critical issue, according to program engineers.

=== DIRECT self comparison to Ares ===
DIRECT contended that the requirement to develop 5-segment SRBs and the J-2X upper stage engine for Ares I in order to fly the first Orion was directly responsible for the delays in schedule and the comparatively high development costs. All-new manufacturing at the Michoud Assembly Facility and launch facilities at Kennedy Space Center would also be required for Ares I. In contrast, DIRECT proposed to reuse the existing 4-segment fully human rated Space Shuttle Solid Rocket Booster and Space Shuttle Main Engine. DIRECT also proposed reuse of existing manufacturing to build a modified variant of the existing Space Shuttle External Tank. Only moderate modifications would be required at Kennedy Space Center to enable launches. DIRECT's proposal for a single launch vehicle were intended to remove the program risks associated with the possible cancellation of the Ares V launcher due to budgetary constraints.

DIRECT asserted its Jupiter launchers would avoid the delays of Ares I by not requiring the J-2X on the first-generation Jupiter-130 vehicle, by not requiring the five-segment SRB and by providing more than 60 t of lift performance that would ameliorate weight issues on the Orion design.

DIRECT also claimed that money would be saved by avoiding a parallel development of the Ares V booster, since the Jupiter family would represent a single rocket family program. The group suggested that the money saved on Ares V be reused to speed development work of such other elements as the Orion, the Jupiter-130, launch facility modifications and all associated systems. A significant cash injection was expected to allow the schedules of all those elements to be trimmed substantially, allowing full operational capability of an Orion/Jupiter-130 system to perform 6-person crew rotations and cargo deliveries to the ISS by 2013.

=== Cost Savings and Crewed Spaceflight Gap ===
Proponents asserted that the DIRECT proposal would enable NASA to fulfill the mandate of the Vision for Space Exploration sooner and more safely than the planned Ares I and Ares V, at a lower cost and with less programmatic risk due to a simpler approach which decreases new development efforts. Advocates said the DIRECT proposal would allow NASA to provide sufficient money to continue funding programs beyond launch vehicle development and operation, including extending its participation in the International Space Station, which was scheduled to end in 2016 as of 2009. The DIRECT proposal also suggested that NASA could use costs savings from the DIRECT proposal to accelerate the VSE's schedule for returning to the Moon and to potentially fly other missions such as servicing missions to the Hubble Space Telescope. In contrast to these claims, NASA senior manager for the STS program, John Shannon stated that he thought the DIRECT proposal underestimated the costs for the Jupiter rocket family.

=== Orbital Assembly Steps ===
The DIRECT proposal required more orbital assembly steps than the proposed Constellation Program. In Constellation, after Low Earth Orbital rendezvous of Ares I and Ares V, the Orion Crew Exploration Vehicle (approximately 22 t) from the Ares I would invert and dock with the Altair lunar lander (approximately 44 t) which would still be attached to the Ares V Earth Departure Stage. In the case of DIRECT, the combined mass of Orion and Altair would exceed the carrying capacity of the Jupiter-130. If a Jupiter-130 were launched with Orion and a Jupiter-246 launched with Altair, the Jupiter Upper Stage (JUS) with Altair would have insufficient propellant to push Altair/Orion beyond Earth orbit. Thus, the DIRECT baseline was to launch two Jupiter-246s, one with a partially fueled (75 t) JUS carrying Orion/Altair and the other with only a fully fueled (175 t) JUS. After orbital rendezvous, the Orion would invert and re-dock with Altair much like in the Apollo Program and Constellation Program. However, with DIRECT, the crew in Orion would have to separate Orion/Altair from the first JUS and dock Altair to the second JUS. The second JUS would have enough remaining propellant to serve as the Earth Departure Stage. The first JUS would be discarded in Low Earth Orbit, while the second would be discarded after its Earth departure burn.

=== Jupiter Upper Stage Mass ===
The Jupiter Upper Stage (JUS) mass to propellant capacity has been regarded as realistic. Minimal upper stage mass is desirable so that the stage may propel the Orion and Altair spacecraft out of Earth orbit, but the JUS would need to be large enough to carry enough propellant to both achieve low Earth Orbit and to serve as the Earth departure stage. The DIRECT v3.0 JUS had a putative mass of 11.3 t for a propellant capacity of 175.5 t. While claiming a design heritage from the Centaur series of upper stages, DIRECT specifically cited new materials, new welding techniques, and a common bulkhead separating the Liquid Oxygen and Liquid Hydrogen tanks as sufficient to account for the low stage mass. Bernard Kutter of United Launch Alliance described the even more radical DIRECT v2.0 JUS design as, "...very reasonable. I’d even call it conservative."

=== Payload Capacity ===
The payload capacity of Ares V to low earth orbit, according to NASA, would have been 188,000 kg. This was more than the largest proposed Jupiter rocket (Jupiter-246 Heavy with 5 segment SRBS) which was claimed to lift about 120,000 kg to LEO. For potential Mars missions more launches per mission would thus be required using Jupiter instead of Ares V and the mission modules would need to be separated in more different parts. However, NASA's Design Reference Mission 5.0 completed in 2007 required only a 125mt+ launch vehicle with a 10m+ diameter shroud for a Mars mission with 6 separate Ares V launches. The Jupiter rocket would fulfill the requirements of the Design Reference Mission with only a very narrow shortfall in payload to LEO, while fulfilling the volume requirements.

The Jupiter rockets would be shorter in height than the Ares V, permitting very long payload fairings and thus greater total internal volume than possible with the taller Ares V, which would quickly encounter restraints due to height limitations within the Vehicle Assembly Building at Kennedy Space Center.

== Variants ==
Many configurations of Jupiter were projected, with the May 2009 DIRECT version 3.0 proposal recommending two: the Jupiter-130 and Jupiter-246, with claimed lift capacities exceeding 60 and 90 tonnes (t) (or 70 and 110 tons for cargo versions), respectively, to low Earth orbit.

=== Jupiter-130 ===
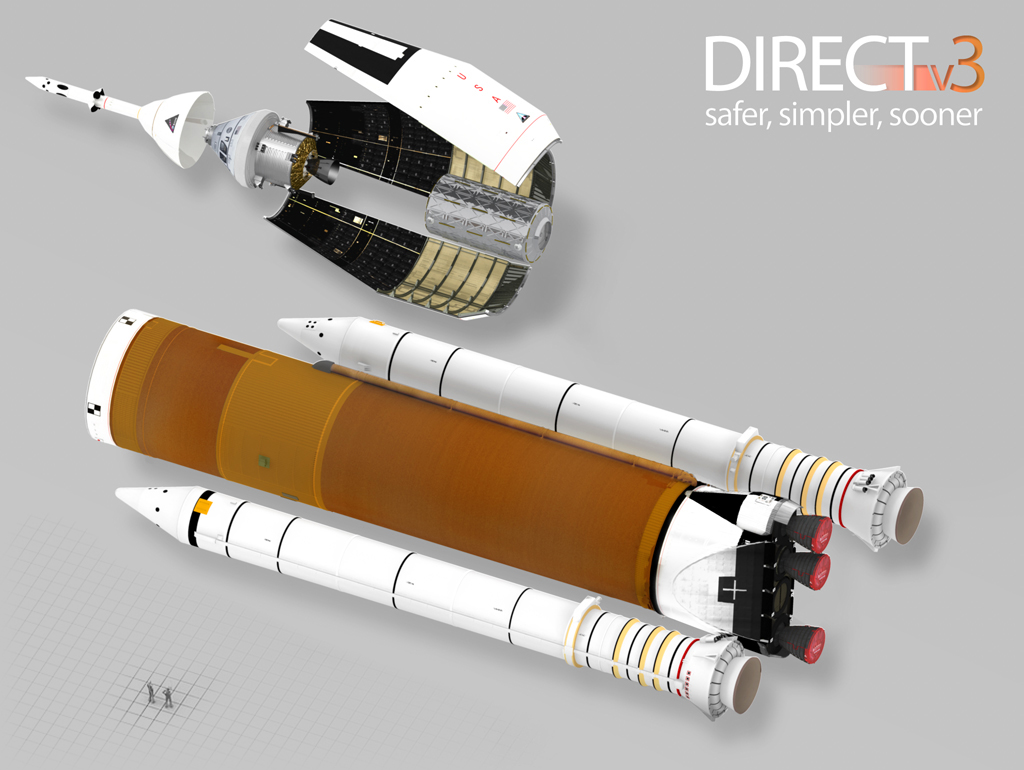
Expanded diagram of the DIRECT v3.0 Jupiter-130 configuration

DIRECT proposed that the Jupiter-130 be the first configuration developed, with the goal of becoming operational within four years of the start of the development program. The Jupiter-130 would have consisted of the Jupiter common core stage with one SSME removed, no upper stage, and a payload fairing on top. "130" stands for one cryogenic stage, three main engines, and zero upper-stage engines. Initial launches would rotate crews and bring cargo to the International Space Station, a function carried out by Soyuz rockets at the time.

DIRECT calculations indicated that the Jupiter-130 would have been able to deliver between over 60 t and over 70 t of cargo or cargo and crew to a variety of circular and elliptical inclined low Earth orbits. When the mass of the proposed Orion spacecraft and crew is subtracted (18 - 22 t depending on the mission), the remainder compared favorably with the approximately 25 t cargo capacity of the Space Shuttle, and the lack of capacity of Ares I besides the Orion spacecraft.

=== Jupiter-246 ===
The Jupiter-246 would have used four Space Shuttle Main Engines (SSMEs) in the common core stage with an upper stage, informally called the Jupiter Upper Stage (JUS). The Jupiter-246 would use six RL10B-2 engines on the upper stage. "246" stands for two cryogenic stages, four main engines, and six upper stage engines. The primary role for the Jupiter-246 would be to launch heavier cargo as well as crew and cargo for lunar missions.

=== Jupiter-241 ===
The Jupiter-241 would have four SSMEs in the common core stage with a second stage, but instead of 6 RL10B-2s, 1 J-2X, if the technology became available. “241” stands for two cryogenic stages, four main engines, and one second stage engine. Its purpose would be the same as the Jupiter-246’s.

==== Jupiter Upper Stage ====
Because the Jupiter-246 would have used four SSMEs on propellant tanks originally sized for three engines, the core stage propellant would be depleted before achieving low Earth orbit, and a large capacity upper stage would deliver payload into orbit. Launched with a partial upper stage propellant load of 75 t, a Jupiter-246 could deliver over 84 t of crew and cargo to a circular 241 km (130 nmi), 29° inclined orbit. Launched with no crew or payload, the same 75 t of propellant could deliver an additional 100 t of propellant to the same orbit. The total JUS capacity was to be approximately 175 t. For lunar missions where the JUS is to serve as the Earth departure stage, a full load of 175 t of propellant would be launched and 75 t would be consumed in achieving low Earth orbit, leaving 100 t available for the Earth departure burn.

In line with the DIRECT v3.0 theme of using as much existing hardware as possible, DIRECT proposes the veteran RL10 engine family to power the JUS. However, DIRECT anticipated similar performance for its upper stage from the J-2X engine, previously under development for the Ares I and Ares V upper stages.

== Design considerations ==
=== Existing engine use ===
One of the primary goals of the DIRECT proposal is to develop a new heavy lift rocket in a shorter time frame. When the DIRECT project began in 2006, the Shuttle was expected to be operational for another four years or so. DIRECT was planned to use the four-segment Solid Rocket Booster (SRB) unchanged from the Shuttle and to make use of work already underway for the Constellation Project on the RS-68 main engine and J-2X upper stage engine.

By 2009, however, there were concerns that the ablatively-cooled RS-68 engine could not survive the intense heat from the nearby SRBs. With this worry and with Shuttle retirement imminent, the DIRECT v3.0 proposal called for using the more expensive regeneratively-cooled, reusable Space Shuttle Main Engine (SSME) in a disposable role. Three or four SSMEs attached to the bottom of the core tank structure would be discarded in Earth's atmosphere along with the tank. For missions beyond lower Earth orbit, the Jupiter Upper Stage would use six Pratt and Whitney RL10B-2s.

Before it could be launched, NASA's proposed Ares I rocket would have required both a new, modified five-segment version of the Space Shuttle SRB and the J-2X upper stage engine, a modification of the J-2 engine used on the Saturn V. The proposed Jupiter family could have launched with currently available engines, with the ability to upgrade to a more powerful SRB and J-2X upper stage engine should they become available.

=== Crew safety ===
DIRECT envisioned continued development and operation of NASA's Orion crewed spacecraft, including its Launch Abort System (LAS). In the event of an emergency, the LAS would pull the crew capsule to safety as it would on NASA's Ares I. The DIRECT Team asserted, however, that the Jupiter-130's greater lift capacity - 64 tonnes, versus 25 tonnes for Ares I - would enable the Orion to be designed with more crew safety capability than was planned.

For crewed flights to the International Space Station (ISS), DIRECT said the added lift capacity of the Jupiter would allow significant cargo to be carried in a separate module mounted below the Orion spacecraft. Once orbit was reached, the Orion would dock with this module and ferry it to the ISS. By comparison, Ares I would be capable of bringing only the Orion spacecraft to the ISS. DIRECT asserted that flying Orion and a separate payload module on a Jupiter would satisfy the safety concerns raised about flying crew separately from cargo following the 2003 Space Shuttle Columbia disaster, since the Orion capsule would still be able to separate from the launch vehicle and any cargo in the event of a launch abort.

==== Jupiter vs. Ares I ====
The DIRECT Team cited a number of particular features that were claimed to make a Jupiter-130 safer than the Ares I:

The Jupiter design would re-use the proven method of Space Shuttle of attaching the SRBs to the tankage though an internal structural member. DIRECT says this would avoid the inducing of potentially severe vibration in the vehicle, resulting from a "thrust oscillation" effect endemic in large solid rockets. This effect became a concern for the Ares I.

As with the Space Shuttle, the liquid main engines of a Jupiter-130 would be ignited on the ground and undergo a rapid checkout before SRB ignition and launch. Start-sequence problems could be detected before committing to the launch, and the only vehicle staging event would be the burnout and separation of the SRBs. By comparison, the Ares I launch consists of the immediate ignition of its single SRB first stage, then requires a staging event and ignition at altitude of its cryogenic second stage. While staging is common launch vehicle practice, it introduces safety, risk and reliability concerns, particularly on crewed flights. (The larger Jupiter-246, with its upper stage, would typically include this risk.)

The DIRECT Team asserted that the Jupiter-130 and -246, with their multiple main engines, would be capable of reaching orbit even in the event of an engine shutdown.

In the Jupiter concept, the crewed Orion spacecraft would be supported by a large aerodynamic fairing. This arrangement would place the Orion at least 10 m (33 ft) further away from propellant-filled stages than it would be on an Ares I. DIRECT asserted this would provide a valuable additional "buffer space" between an exploding vehicle and the crew.

The envisioned lift capacity of the Jupiter-130 could allow protective hardware to be mounted inside the payload fairing, below the Orion spacecraft. DIRECT postulated mounting a lightweight shield made from boron carbide and Kevlar between the spacecraft and the stages below to help protect the crew from shrapnel and other debris from a vehicle explosion.

== See also ==
- Jupiter-C, 1950s-era launch system
- Saturn (rocket family)
- Shuttle-Derived Heavy Lift Launch Vehicle
- Space Launch System
- Studied Space Shuttle Variations and Derivatives
- National Launch System
- NASA Advanced Space Transportation Program
- Shuttle-Derived Heavy Lift Launch Vehicle
- Space Launch System
