= Studied Space Shuttle designs =

Launch vehicle study

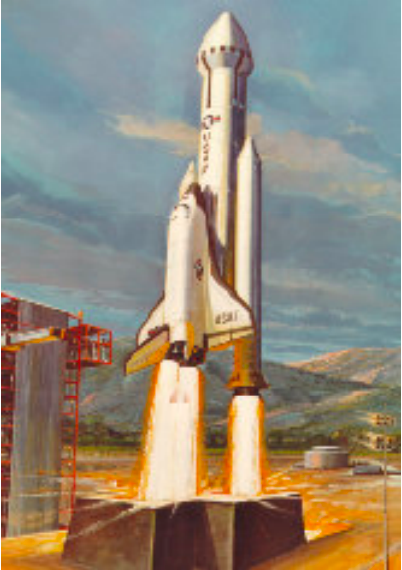
Artist's concept of 35-foot-diameter (10.6 m) Hammerhead configuration at launch.

During the lifetime of the Space Shuttle, Rockwell International and many other organizations studied various Space Shuttle designs. These involved different ways of increasing cargo and crew capacity, as well as investigating further reusability. A large focus of these designs were related to developing new shuttle boosters and improvements to the central tank, but also looked to expand NASA's ability to launch deep space missions and build modular space stations. Many of these concepts and studies would shape the concepts and programs of the 2000s such as the Constellation, Orbital Space Plane Program, and Artemis program.

== Shuttle-derived vehicles ==
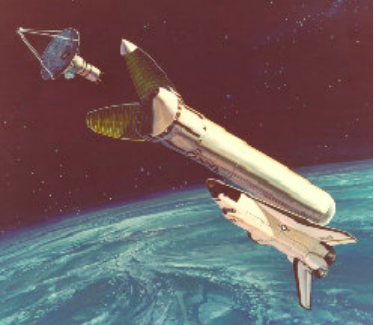
Artist's concept of 25-foot-diameter (7.6 m) fairing

=== Shuttle-C ===
The Heavy Lift Launch Vehicle was a study by NASA to turn the Space Shuttle launch stack into a dedicated uncrewed cargo launcher. The external tank and Space Shuttle Solid Rocket Boosters (SRBs) would be combined with a cargo module that took the place of the shuttle orbiter and included the Space Shuttle Main Engines. A ballistic return pod would be used as the main engine structure and carry 2-4 SSMEs as well as mount the payload/booster stage. It would be recovered via parachutes in the Australian outback or northern Mexico. Small lifting wings were added to allow more accurate landings. Various Heavy Lift Launch Vehicle concepts were investigated between 1984 and 1995 and it would eventually become known as the Shuttle-C, which lacked reusable engines and ballistic return pods.

The Shuttle-C concept would theoretically cut development costs for a heavy launch vehicle by re-using technology developed for the Shuttle program. End-of-life and Space Shuttle hardware would also have been used. One proposal involved converting the Columbia or Enterprise into a single-use cargo launcher.

With the Shuttle-C, it was thought that the lower maintenance and safety requirements for the uncrewed vehicle would allow a higher flight rate. Before the loss of Space Shuttle Challenger, NASA had expected about 14 shuttle flights a year. In the aftermath of the Challenger incident, it became clear that this launch rate was not feasible for a variety of reasons.

The Shuttle-C would also launch an uncrewed lunar lander and propulsion module while a second vehicle would launch the Crew Exploration Vehicle to perform lunar missions. The Shuttle-C would additionally act as the crewed component of the International Lunar Resources Exploration Concept proposed in 1993.

In the early 1990s, NASA engineers planning a crewed mission to Mars included a Shuttle-C design to launch six non reusable 80-ton segments to create two Mars ships in Earth orbit. After President George W. Bush called for the end of the Space Shuttle by 2010, these proposed configurations were put aside.

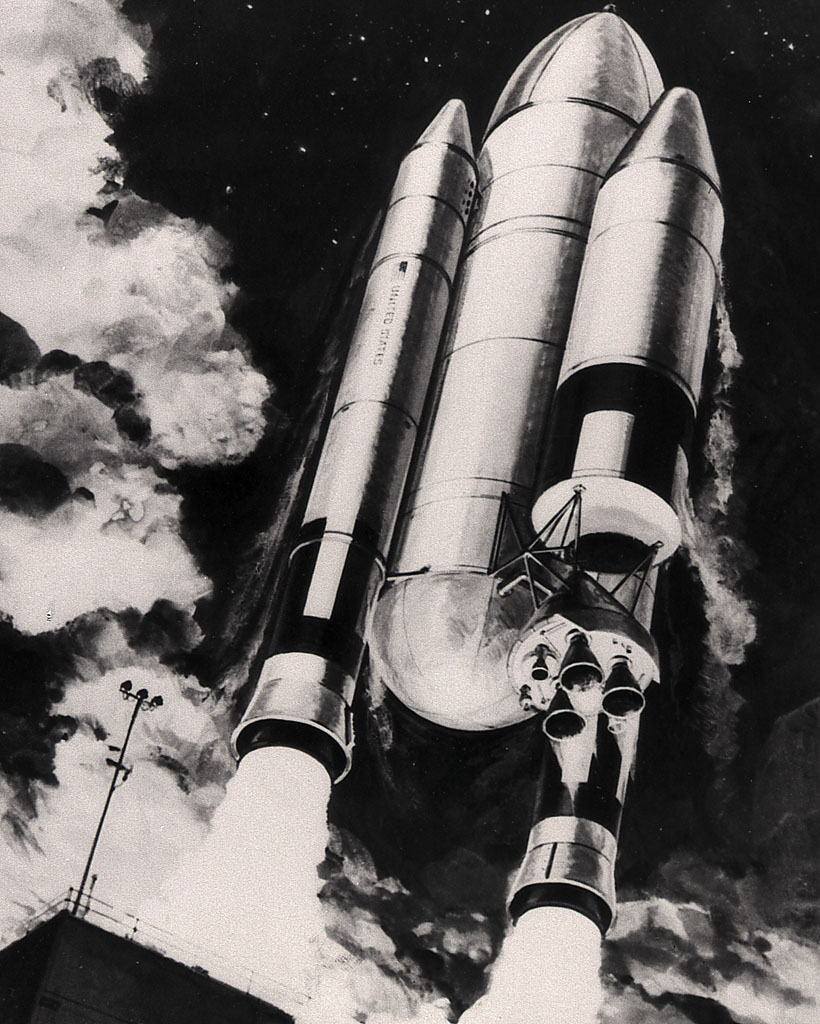
HLLV

=== Magnum ===
The Magnum was a large Super heavy-lift launch vehicle designed by NASA's Marshall Space Flight Center during the mid-1990s. The Magnum would have been a booster around 315 feet (96 m) tall, on the scale of the Saturn V, and was originally designed to carry a human mission to Mars. It was to have used two strap-on side boosters, similar to the Space Shuttle Solid Rocket Boosters (SRBs), but using liquid fuel instead. Some designs had strap-on boosters using wings and jet engines, which would enable them to fly back to the launch area after they were jettisoned in flight. The Magnum was designed to carry around 80 tons of payload into low Earth orbit (LEO).

National Launch System

=== National Launch System ===
The National Launch System (or New Launch System) was a study authorized in 1991 by President George H. W. Bush to outline alternatives to the Space Shuttle for access to Earth orbit. Shortly thereafter, NASA asked Lockheed Missiles and Space, McDonnell Douglas, and TRW to perform a ten-month study.

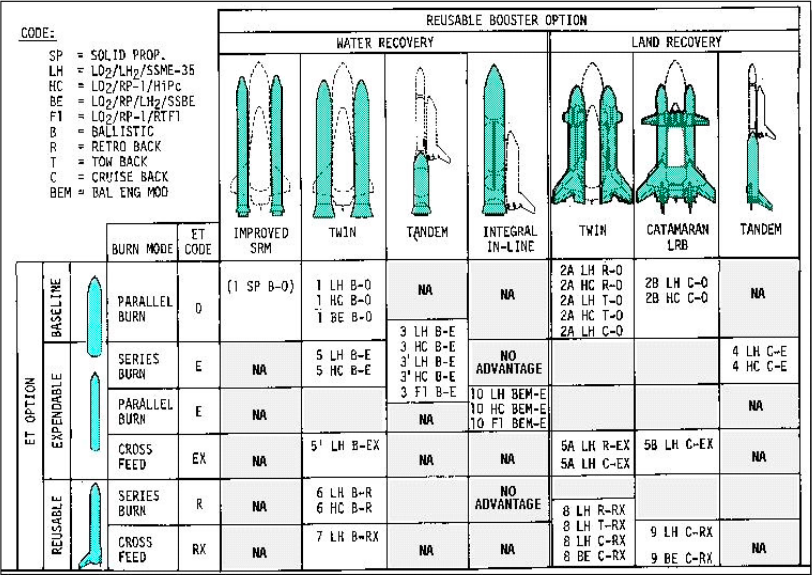
A Wide Variety of Booster, External Tank, and Propellant Options Were Studied

A series of launch vehicles was proposed, based on the proposed Space Transportation Main Engine (STME) liquid-fuel rocket engine. The STME was to be a simplified, expendable version of the RS-25 engine. The NLS-1 was the largest of the three proposed vehicles and would have used a modified Space Shuttle external tank for its core stage. The tank would have fed liquid oxygen and liquid hydrogen to four STMEs attached to the bottom of the tank. A payload or second stage would have fit atop the core stage, and two detachable Space Shuttle Solid Rocket Boosters would have been mounted on the sides of the core stage as on the Shuttle. Period illustrations suggest that much larger rockets than NLS-1 were contemplated, using multiples of the NLS-1 core stage.

== Upgraded boosters ==
Early studies looked at alternate booster and external tank configurations such as:

- SRM options that placed the SRBs inline but aft of the external tank (ET)
- Liquid rocket boosters, both hydrogen and propane to replace the SRBs
- Twin and catamaran flyback boosters to replace the SRBs
- An engine pod aft of the ET fed from twin fuel tanks where the SRBs would normally be located
- An in-line integrated booster/ET with a recoverable aft-engine pod
- Tandem boosters and ETs in a variety of recoverable concepts
- A single booster with multiple ETs (expendable and recoverable)

=== Advanced Solid Rocket Motor (ASRM) Project ===
NASA had planned on replacing the post-Challenger SRBs with a new Advanced Solid Rocket Motor (ASRM) to be built by Aerojet. They would have been built at a new facility designed by a subcontractor, RUST International, on the location of a canceled Tennessee Valley Authority nuclear power plant in Yellow Creek, Mississippi. The ASRM would have produced additional thrust in order to increase the shuttle payload to carry modules and construction components to the ISS. The ASRM program was canceled in 1993, after robotic assembly systems and computers were on-site and approximately 2 billion dollars spent, after NASA opted to instead issue minor corrections to the existing SRBs.

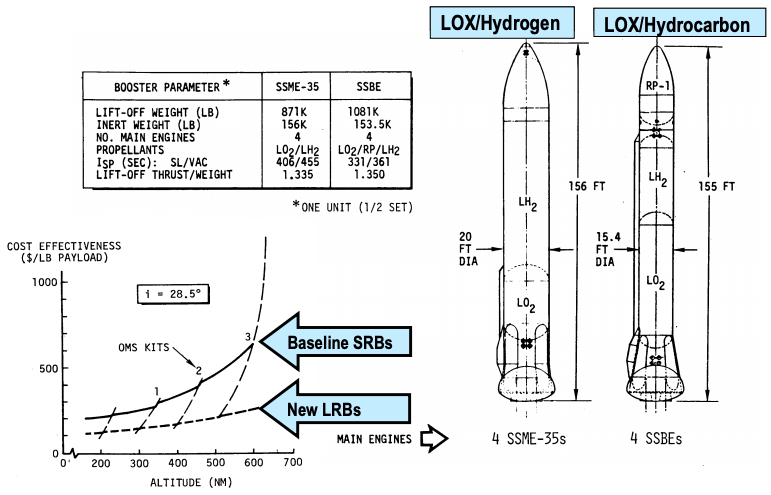
NASA/MSFC design for Recoverable Liquid Boosters

=== Recoverable Liquid Booster ===
A large focus of the NASA/MSFC Shuttle Growth Study contract was upgraded Recoverable Liquid Boosters. The boosters would have a similar flight path to the solid rocket motors, separating and deploying a parachute for recovery in the Atlantic Ocean. They were to be water-recoverable and used clamshell doors to protect the engines from saltwater immersion.

=== Liquid Fly-back Booster ===
Liquid Flyback Booster concepts date back to the early 1970s. Original Shuttle boosters were massive piloted fly-back boosters. The concept was studied throughout the 1980s but shelved after the Challenger disaster shut down most Shuttle upgrades. The Flyback booster concept reemerged in 1997 during the NASA Liquid Flyback Booster Study. The concept was abandoned due to the increased complexity and minor returns. The Shuttle Growth Study built on this background by developing design concepts in great detail for the liquid rocket boosters.

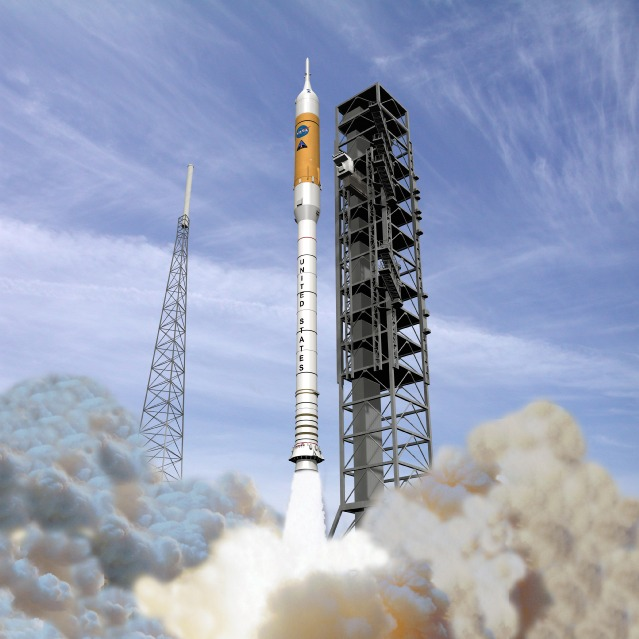
The Ares I launch vehicle would have used a Five-Segment SRB

=== Five-Segment Booster ===
Prior to the destruction of the Space Shuttle Columbia in 2003, NASA investigated the replacement of the current 4-segment SRBs with either a 5-segment SRB design or replacing them altogether with liquid "flyback" boosters using either Atlas V or Delta IV EELV technologies. The 5-segment SRB, which would have required little change to the current shuttle infrastructure, would have allowed the space shuttle to carry an additional 20,000 lb (9,100 kg) of payload in a 51.6°-inclination orbit, eliminate the dangerous "Return-to-Launch Site" (RTLS) and "Trans-Oceanic Abort" (TAL) modes, and, by using a so-called "dog-leg maneuver", fly south-to-north polar orbiting flights from Kennedy Space Center. After the destruction of Columbia, NASA shelved the five-segment SRB for the Shuttle Program, and the three surviving Orbiters, Discovery, Atlantis, and Endeavour were retired in 2011 after the completion of the International Space Station. One five-segment engineering test motor, ETM-03, was fired on October 23, 2003.

As part of the Constellation program, the first stage of the Ares I rocket was planned to use five-segment SRBs – in September 2009 a five-segment Space Shuttle SRB was static fired on the ground in ATK's desert testing area in Utah.

After the Constellation program was canceled in 2011, the new Space Launch System (SLS) was designated to use five-segment boosters. The first test of an SRB for SLS was completed in early 2015, and a second test was performed in mid-2016 at Orbital ATK's Promontory, Utah facility.

== External Tank Cargo Fairing ==
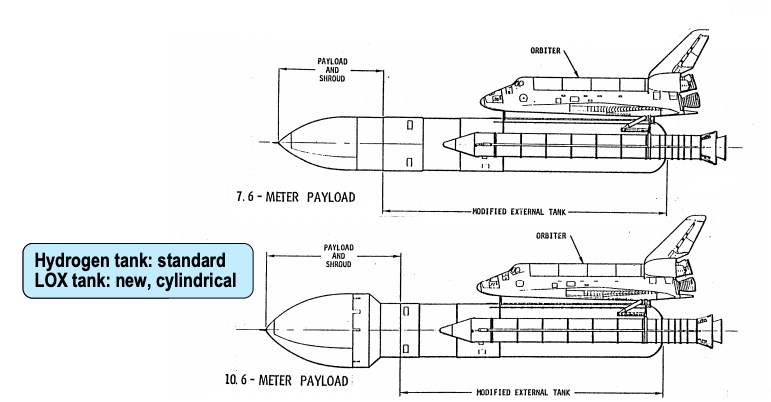
Space Shuttle 7.6 and 10.6 Fairing

DARPA studied modifying the current external tank design to be able to carry low-density payloads in a 25 or 35 ft (7.6 or 10.6 m) diameter fairing where the oxygen tank was currently. The Shuttle on average would only fly 66% of its payload capability but at nearly 100% of its payload volume. The external tank payload fairing would solve this problem. The oxygen tank would be redesigned as a cylindrical tank rather than conical and the clamshell payload fairing would be mounted directly on it. In this configuration, the orbiter would launch without any payload. These studies were eventually abandoned due to the fact that the new aerodynamic profile would make a Return to Launch Site (RTLS) maneuver impossible. The proposal was reconfigured as an Aft Cargo Carrier (ACC) to be positioned towards the bottom of the tank rather than on top. This idea made it far into development with Martin Marietta contracted to design and fabricate the container. The first flights of the ACC were expected in 1986. However, after the Challenger disaster, the ACC as well as most payload-related Shuttle upgrades were canceled.

== Modified orbiters ==
The following are all accounts mentioned or discussed by Carl F. Ehrlich Jr. in Shuttle Variations And Derivatives That Never Happened - An Historical Review

=== Stretched orbiter ===
In anticipation of upgraded boosters for the Shuttle, a design for a stretched orbiter was made. It would have had a larger payload bay with an additional 15 feet (4.6 m) in length giving it a payload capacity of 75 feet (23 m) and expected to carry payloads of up to 100,000 lb (45,000 kg). A new wing root and carry-through structure were designed to handle the additional weight at landing, keeping the outboard section of the original wings and requiring minimal modification. The 15-foot (4.6 m) barrel section would be attached just forward of the 1305 bulkhead towards the rear of the vehicle.

=== Humpback orbiter ===
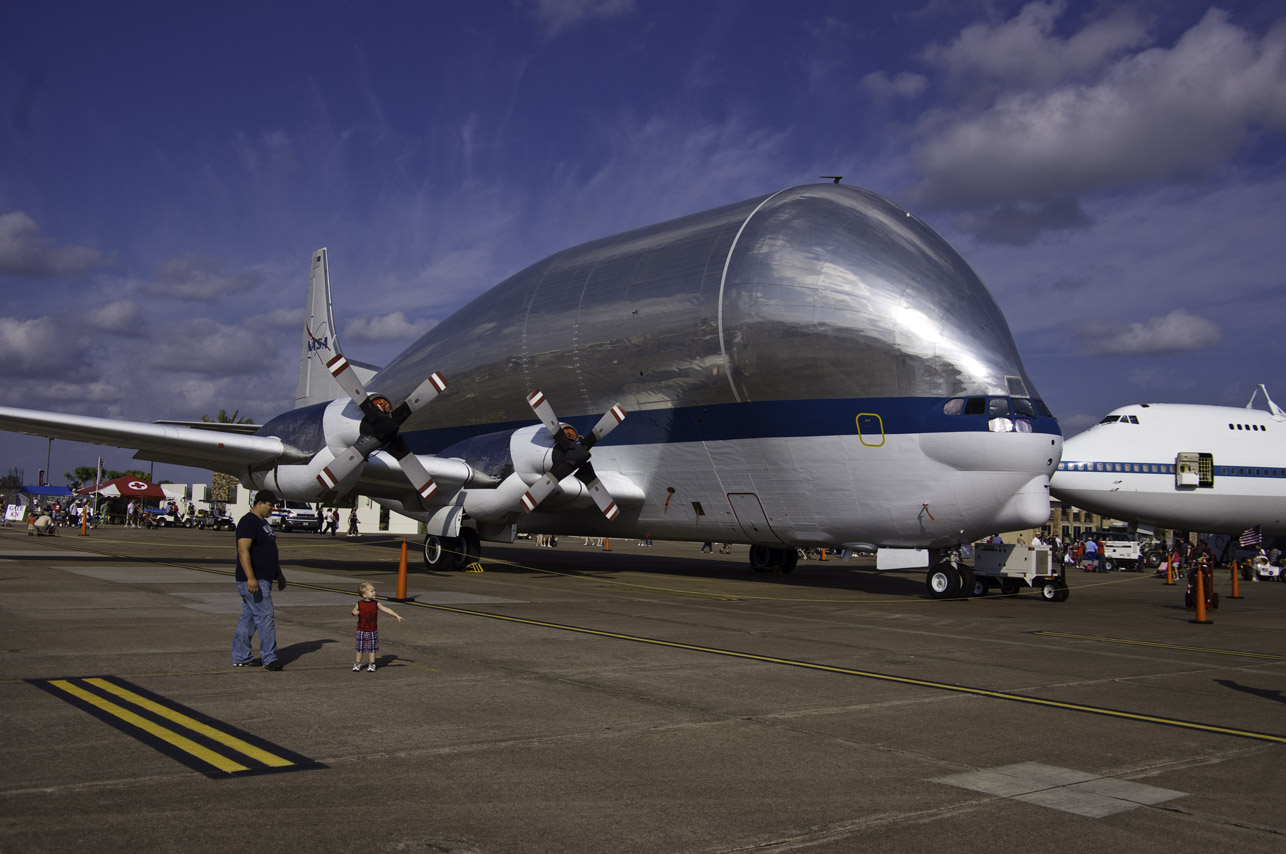
The Super Guppy's "humpback" design

An undefined need for more payload led to the idea of using the lee side section of the payload bay (at the entry angle of attack) as an expanded payload bay. This would result in a "humpback" outsize cargo vehicle similar to the Airbus Beluga or the Aero Spacelines Super Guppy. The hypersonic aerodynamic characteristics during re-entry would stay mostly the same however issues would have most likely occurred at subsonic speeds without a high angle of attack.

=== Unpowered orbiter ===
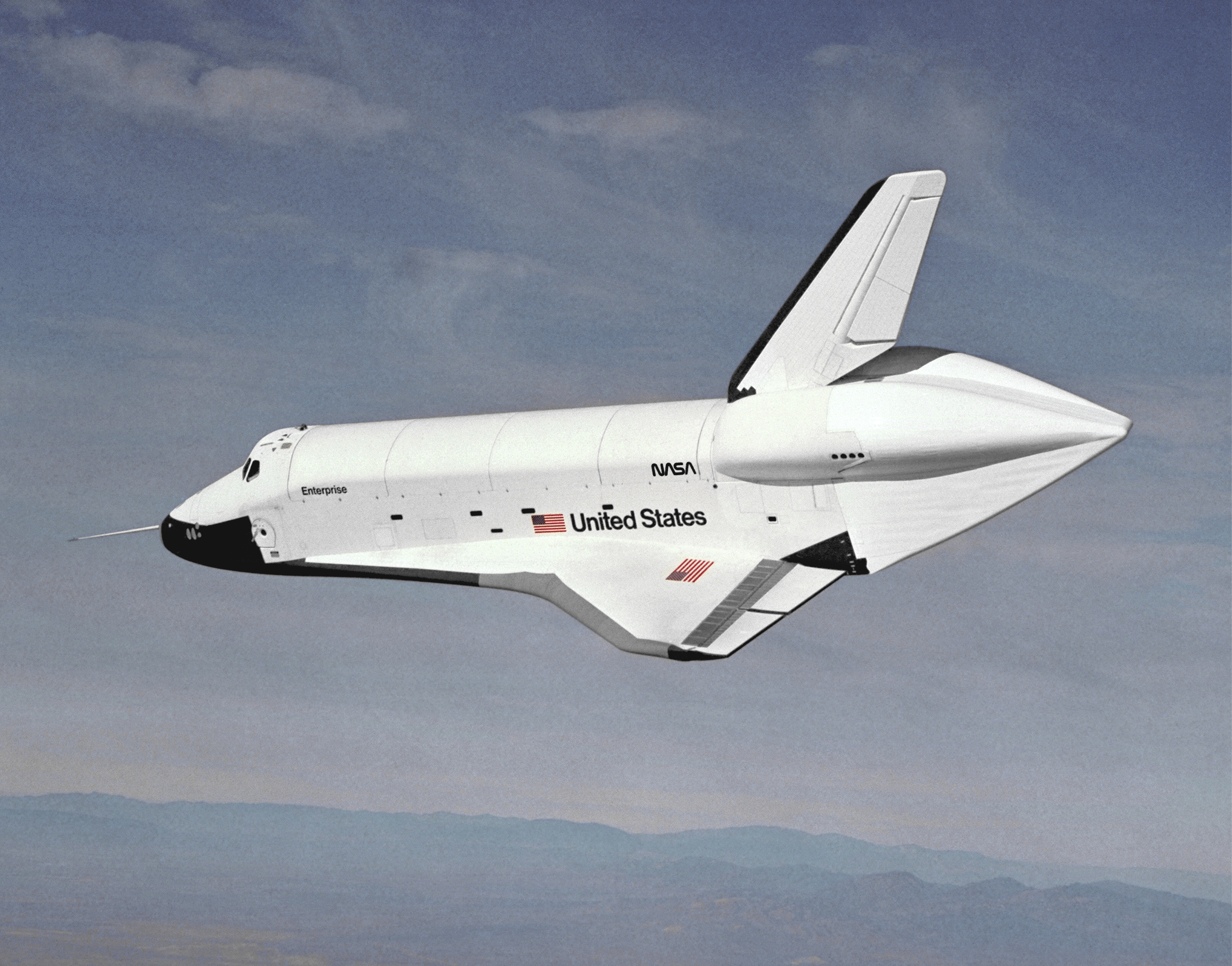
The Space Shuttle Enterprise unpowered test vehicle would have been the basis for the unpowered orbiter

As an internal response to the Soviets' engineless Buran orbiter, an unpowered Orbiter was designed at Marshall Space Flight Center. A payload bay segment would be added to the rear of the spacecraft and look very similar to the Space Shuttle Enterprise albeit with a few differences. Most of the equipment was stored in the rear of the craft to make up for lost weight and compensate for a lack of engines.

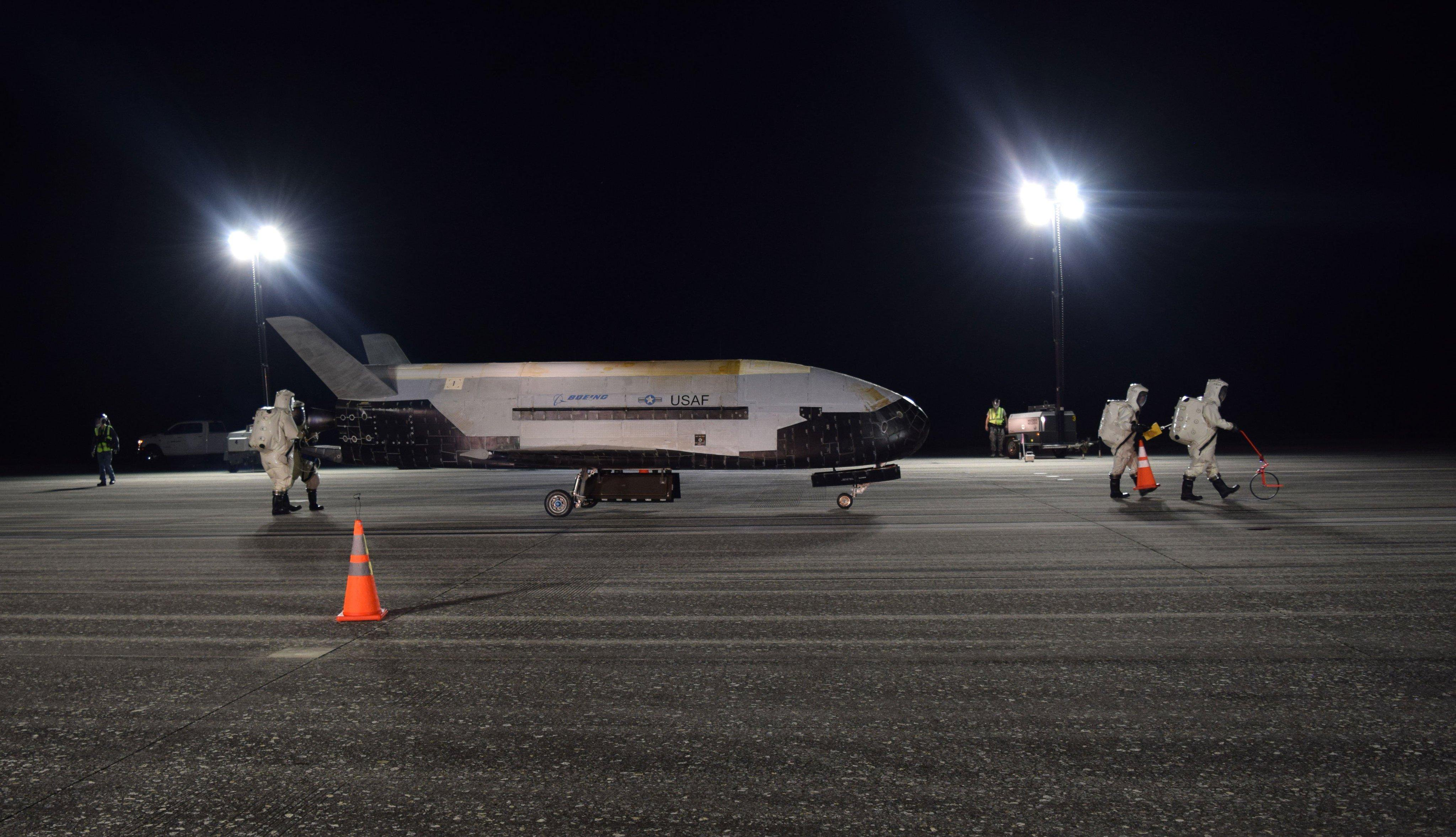
The Boeing X-37B, the only CRV and OSP design to make it into production

=== Crew Emergency Return Vehicle ===
From the late 1980s to the early 2000s NASA, in one form or another, pursued the Crew Return Vehicle; a small spaceplane/capsule capable of returning crew from a space station in the event of an emergency. Candidates evaluated included an Apollo-derived capsule, NASA's HL-20, HL-10, and M2F2, and the Air Force's X-24A. A sub-scale variant of the shuttle was proposed based on the ballistic return pod that was studied for the HLLV. The pressurized crew section would be modified into a lifting body. The main advantage of this design would be the proven technology and re-entry profile of the Shuttle.

=== High Capacity Orbiter ===
A conceptual design for a high-capacity orbiter was drawn up. The concept used a series of canisters mounted in the payload bay that would carry 68 to 74 passengers in a double-deck configuration similar to a Boeing 747. This moved the center of mass forward requiring minor changes to the wing structure adding more canard-like surfaces to allow more lifting surfaces. The design would be used for a Von Braun-style space station that would need crew capacity in the hundreds.

== See also ==
- Space Shuttle
- Shuttle-derived vehicle
- Space Launch System
- Ares I
- Ares V
- Jupiter (rocket family)
- Artemis program
- Constellation program
- Chrysler SERV
