= Shuttle-C =

Uncrewed cargo launcher proposal by NASA

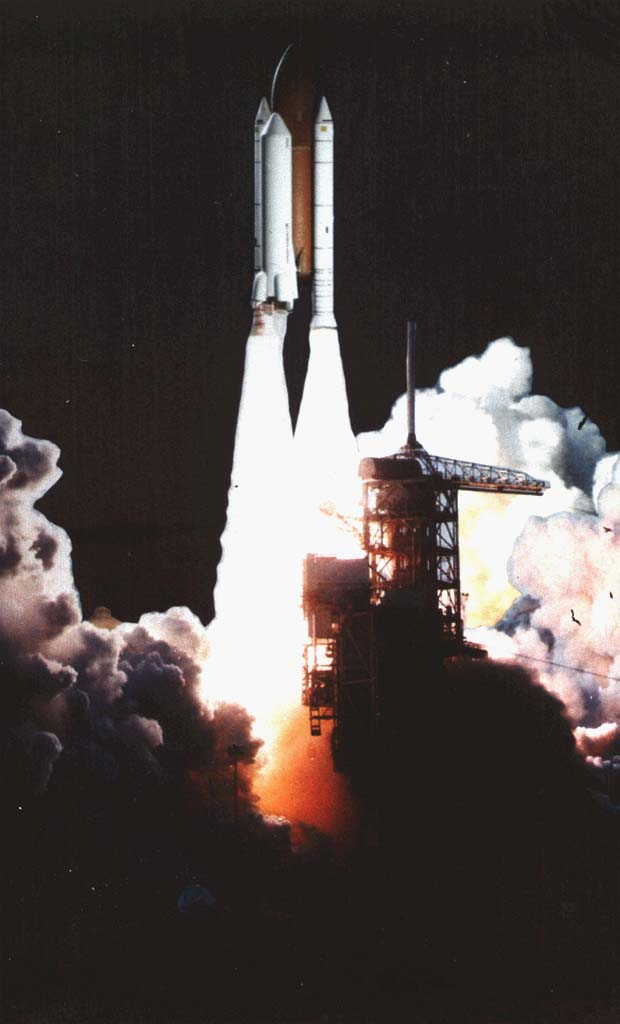
An artist's conception of a Shuttle-C launching at night

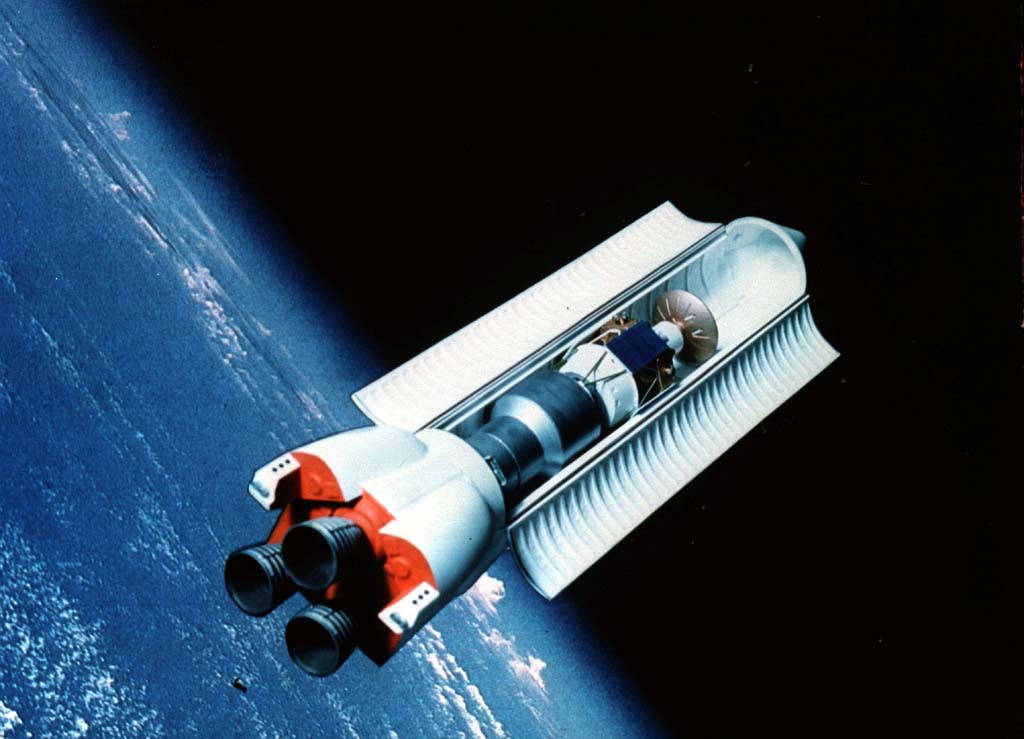
Shuttle-C in space with its cargo bay doors open

The Shuttle-C was a study by NASA to turn the Space Shuttle launch stack into a dedicated uncrewed cargo launcher. The Space Shuttle external tank and Space Shuttle Solid Rocket Boosters (SRBs) would be combined with a cargo module to take the place of the Shuttle orbiter and include the main engines. Various Shuttle-C concepts were investigated between 1984 and 1995.

The Shuttle-C concept would theoretically cut development costs for a heavy launch vehicle by re-using technology developed for the shuttle program. End-of-life and Space Shuttle hardware would also have been used. One proposal even involved converting Columbia or Enterprise into a single-use cargo launcher. Before the loss of Space Shuttle Challenger, NASA had expected about 24 shuttle flights a year. In the aftermath of the Challenger incident, it became clear that this launch rate was not feasible for a variety of reasons. With the Shuttle-C, it was thought that the lower maintenance and safety requirements for the uncrewed vehicle would allow a higher flight rate.

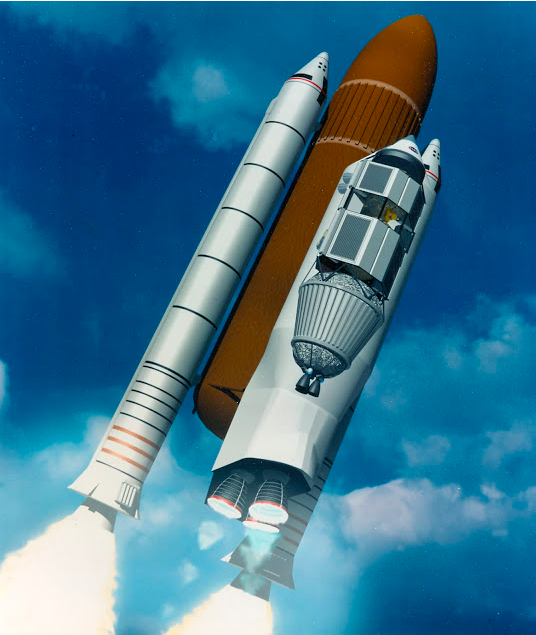
Shuttle-C with ILREC Piloted Lander (launch shroud not visible)

The Shuttle-C would have been the main crew launch vehicle for the ILREC Piloted Lander in the International Lunar Resources Exploration Program.

In the early 1990s, NASA engineers planning a crewed mission to Mars included a Shuttle-C design to launch six non-reusable, 80-ton segments to create two Mars ships in Earth orbit. After President George W. Bush called for the end of the Space Shuttle by 2010, these proposed configurations were put aside.

As early as the 1970s, some iteration of the Shuttle-C had been studied (Encyclopedia Astronautica mentions it as "Class 1 SDV"). It was discussed in Gerard O'Neill's 1976 book The High Frontier: Human Colonies in Space, with artwork by Don Davis.

== See also ==
- Shuttle SERV
- Magnum (rocket)
- Shuttle-derived vehicle
- Shuttle-Derived Heavy Lift Launch Vehicle, a heavy lift launch vehicle with a similar design.
- Energia
- List of space launch system designs
