= Shuttle-derived vehicle =

Launch vehicle built from Space Shuttle components

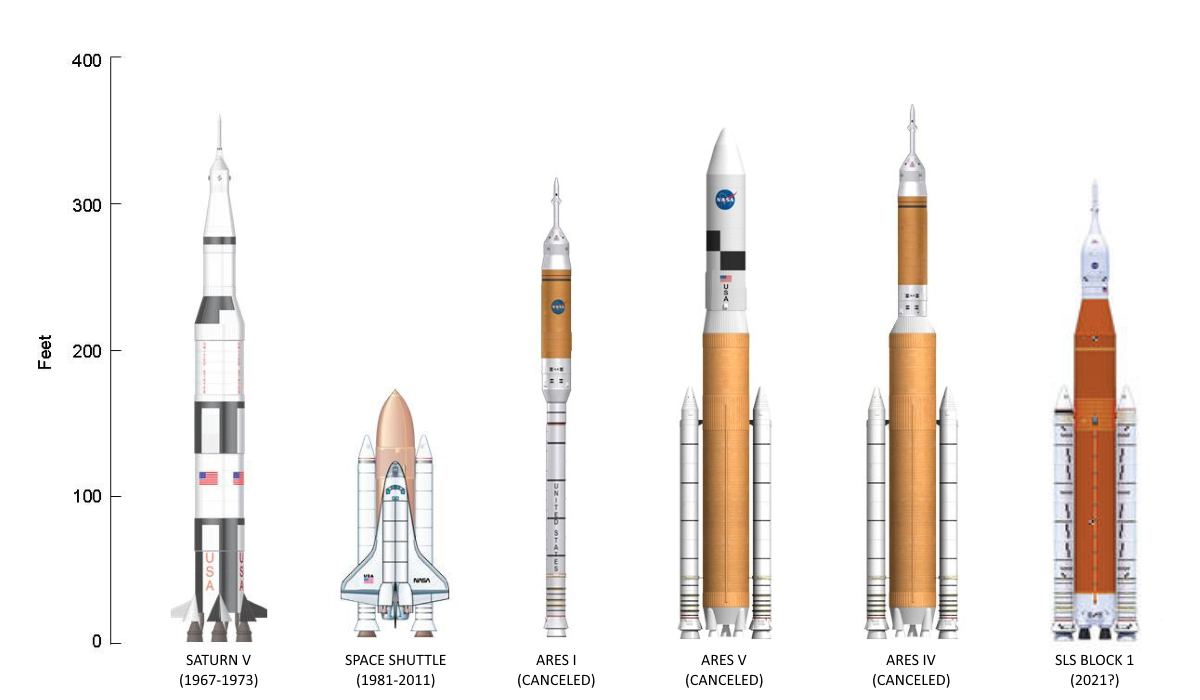
Comparison of Saturn V, Shuttle, Ares I, Ares V, Ares IV, and SLS Block 1

Shuttle-derived vehicles (SDV) are space launch vehicles and spacecraft that use components, technology, and infrastructure originally developed for the Space Shuttle program.

In the late 1980s and early 1990s, NASA formally studied a cargo-only vehicle, Shuttle-C, that would have supplemented the crewed Space Shuttle. In 2005, NASA was developing the Ares I and Ares V launch vehicles, based in part on highly modified Shuttle components, to enable exploration of the Moon and Mars. The agency also studied a third such vehicle, the Ares IV.

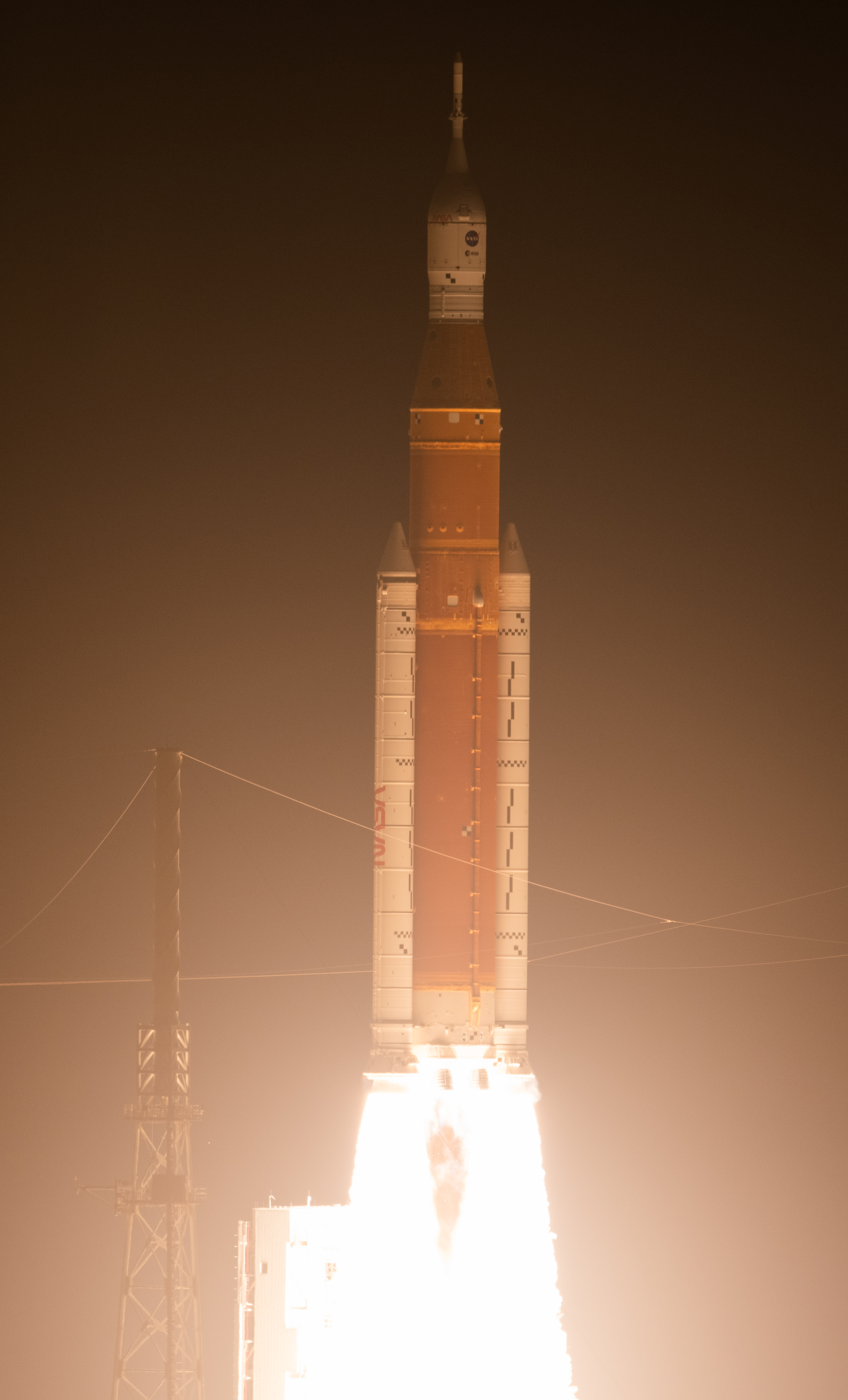
Artemis I Launch

After the earlier programs were cancelled, NASA began development of the Space Launch System (SLS) in 2011. SLS is a super heavy-lift expendable launch vehicle. Its core stage is structurally and visually similar to the Space Shuttle external tank. Each SLS launch reuses and expends four of the pre-flown RS-25D engines that were de-mounted from the Space shuttles. SLS also uses a pair of solid rocket boosters derived from the Space Shuttle Solid Rocket Booster. The first SLS was delivered to Kennedy Space Center in 2021 for the Artemis 1 mission. As of November 2022, this SLS was rolled out to Kennedy Space Center Launch Complex 39B for several attempts to launch, finally launching on 16 November 2022.

== Concepts ==
SDV concepts were proposed even before the Space Shuttle itself began flying.

=== Shuttle-C ===
The Shuttle-C was a study by NASA to turn the Space Shuttle launch stack into a dedicated uncrewed cargo launcher. The Space Shuttle external tank and Space Shuttle Solid Rocket Boosters (SRBs) would be combined with a cargo module in place of the shuttle orbiter including the RS-25 engines. Various Shuttle-C concepts were investigated between 1984 and 1995, but were never implemented.

=== National Launch System ===
The National Launch System (or New Launch System) was a study authorized in 1991 by President George H. W. Bush to study alternatives to the Space Shuttle for access to Earth orbit. Shortly thereafter, NASA asked Lockheed Missiles and Space, McDonnell Douglas, and TRW to perform a ten-month study.

A series of launch vehicles was proposed, based around the proposed Space Transportation Main Engine (STME) liquid-fuel rocket engine. The STME was to be a simplified, expendable version of the Space Shuttle main engine (SSME). The NLS-1 was the largest of three proposed vehicles and would have used a modified Space Shuttle external tank for its core stage. The tank would have fed liquid oxygen and liquid hydrogen to four STMEs attached to the bottom of the tank. A payload or second stage would have fit atop the core stage, and two detachable Space Shuttle Solid Rocket Boosters would have been mounted on the sides of the core stage as on the Shuttle. Period illustrations suggest that much larger rockets than NLS-1 were contemplated, using multiples of the NLS-1 core stage.

=== Constellation program ===
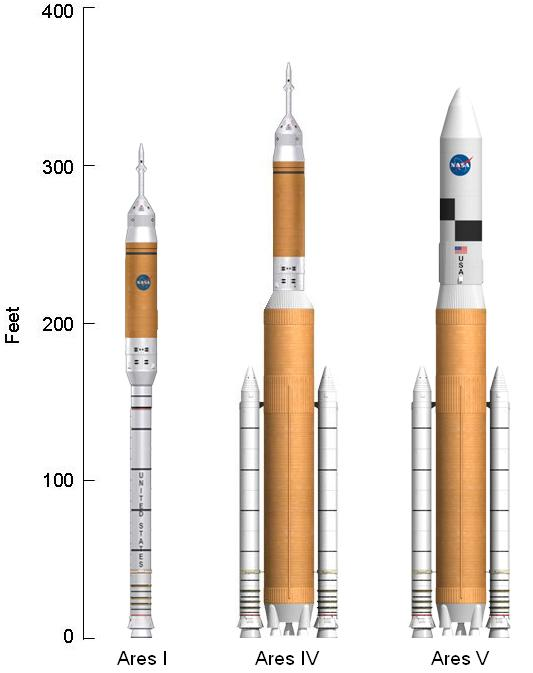
Comparison of the Ares I, Ares IV, and Ares V rockets.

One of the main goals of the Constellation program was the development of spacecraft and booster vehicles to replace the Space Shuttle. NASA had already begun designing two rockets, the Ares I and Ares V, when the program was established. Ares I was designed for the sole purpose of launching mission crews into orbit, while Ares V would have been used to launch other hardware which required a heavier lift capacity than the Ares I booster provided.

==== Ares I ====
Ares I was the crew launch vehicle that was being developed by NASA as part of the Constellation program. The name "Ares" refers to the Greek deity Ares, who is identified with the Roman god Mars. Ares I was originally known as the "Crew Launch Vehicle" (CLV).

NASA planned to use Ares I to launch Orion, the spacecraft intended for NASA human spaceflight missions after the Space Shuttle was retired in 2011. Ares I was to complement the larger, uncrewed Ares V, which was the cargo launch vehicle for Constellation. NASA selected the Ares designs for their anticipated overall safety, reliability and cost-effectiveness. However, the Constellation program, including Ares I was cancelled by U.S. president Barack Obama in October 2010 with the passage of his 2010 NASA authorization bill.

==== Ares V ====
The Ares V (formerly known as the Cargo Launch Vehicle or CaLV) was the planned cargo launch component of the cancelled NASA Constellation program, which was to have replaced the Space Shuttle after its retirement in 2011. Ares V was also planned to carry supplies for a human presence on Mars. Ares V and the smaller Ares I were named after Ares, the Greek god of war.

The Ares V was to launch the Earth Departure Stage and Altair lunar lander for NASA's return to the Moon, which was then planned for 2019. It would also have served as the principal launcher for missions beyond the Earth-Moon system, including the program's ultimate goal, a crewed mission to Mars. The uncrewed Ares V would complement the smaller, and human-rated Ares I rocket for the launching of the 4–6 person Orion spacecraft. Both rockets, deemed safer than the then-current Space Shuttle, would have employed technologies developed for the Apollo program, the Shuttle program, and the Delta IV EELV program. However, the Constellation program, including Ares V was cancelled by U.S. president Barack Obama in October 2010 with the passage of his 2010 NASA authorization bill.

==== Ares IV ====
The Ares IV concept combines an Ares I upper stage on top of an Ares V. Specifically, the vehicle would consist of the liquid-fueled core stage from the Ares V design, two five-segment solid rocket boosters, and the liquid-fueled upper stage from the Ares I, as described by NASA in January 2007. The Ares IV would be a combined 367 ft (112 m) tall and could be used to reach the Moon. Total payload capacity would be 90,420 lb (41,000 kg) to 240 miles (390 km) for direct trans-lunar injection.

NASA had considered using Ares IV to evaluate high-speed "skip" reentry profiles of the Orion capsule in 2007. NASA had planned flight demonstrations of Ares I and Ares V hardware in "Heavy Lift" configurations beginning in 2013. The "Heavy Lift" test flights were to test the first stage of the Ares V simultaneously with the Ares I upper stage attached on top to save both time and money. The later Heavy Lift test vehicle configurations are similar to the Ares IV vehicle.

==== Ares V Lite ====
Ares V Lite was an alternative launch vehicle for NASA's Constellation program suggested by the Augustine Commission. Ares V Lite was a scaled down Ares V. It would have used five RS-68 engines and two five-segment SRBs and have had a low Earth orbit payload of approximately 140 tonnes (310,000 lb). If chosen, Ares V Lite would have replaced the Ares V and Ares I launchers. One Ares V Lite version would have been a cargo lifter like Ares V and the second version would have carried astronauts in the Orion spacecraft.

==== NASA Side-Mount Vehicle ====
The Shuttle-Derived Heavy Lift Launch Vehicle (HLV) was an alternate super heavy-lift launch vehicle proposal for the NASA Constellation program. It was first presented to the Augustine Commission on 17 June 2009.

Based on the Shuttle-C concept which has been the subject of various studies since the 1980s, the HLV was a SDLV that proposed to replace the winged Orbiter from the Space Shuttle stack with a side-mounted payload carrier. The Space Shuttle external tank (ET) and Space Shuttle Solid Rocket Boosters (SRBs) would have remained the same.

=== Jupiter ===
The Jupiter family of super heavy-lift launch vehicles was part of the proposed DIRECT Shuttle-Derived Launch Vehicle architecture. It was intended to be the alternative to the Ares I and Ares V rockets.

Major benefits were projected from re-using as much hardware and facilities from the Space Shuttle program as possible, including cost savings, experience with existing hardware, and preserving the workforce.

=== Space Launch System ===
The Space Launch System (SLS) is a super heavy-lift expendable launch vehicle, which is used in the Artemis program. It is very similar in design to the NLS-1 concept. It is the primary launch vehicle of NASA's deep space exploration plans, including the crewed lunar flights of the Artemis program and a possible follow-on human mission to Mars. Its first launch, Artemis 1, flew on 16 November 2022. Its first crewed launch, Artemis II, carried four astronauts (Reid Wiseman, Christina Koch, Victor Glover, and Jeremy Hansen) to a lunar flyby, breaking the distance record for furthest humans from Earth, previously held by Apollo 13.

=== Liberty ===
Liberty was a 2011 launch vehicle concept proposed by Alliant Techsystems (ATK) and Astrium for phase 2 of the NASA Commercial Crew Development (CCDev) program intended to stimulate development of privately operated crew vehicles to low Earth orbit.

Similar to the defunct Ares I project, which consisted of a five segment Space Shuttle Solid Rocket Booster (SRB) and a new cryogenic second stage, Liberty would combine a five-segment SRB with the core stage of the European Ariane 5 as a second stage.

== Gallery ==
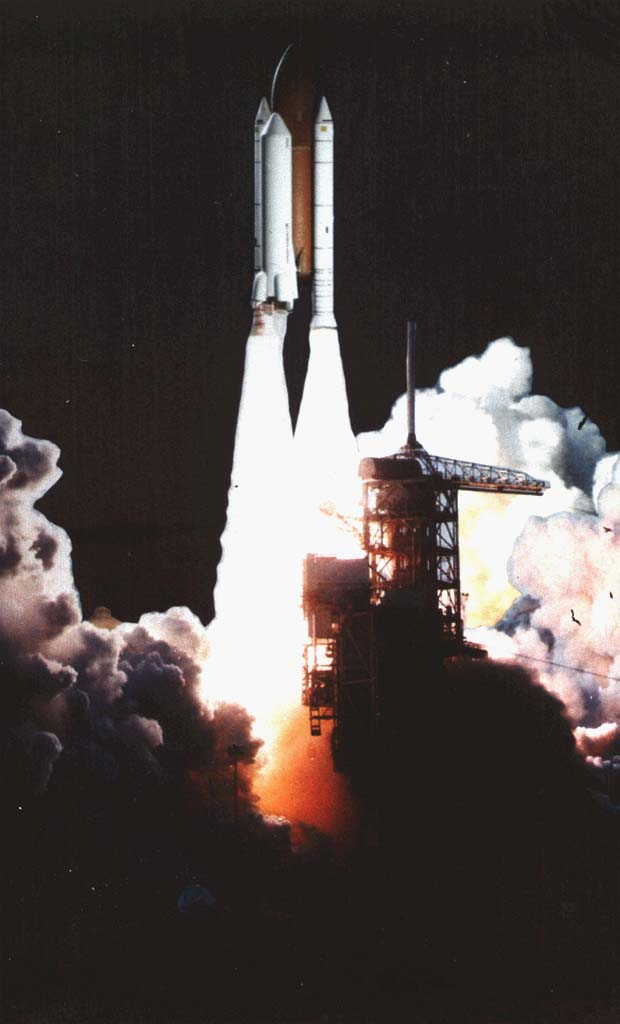
Artist's concept of the Shuttle-C launch vehicle.

Proposed NLS family of launch vehicles.

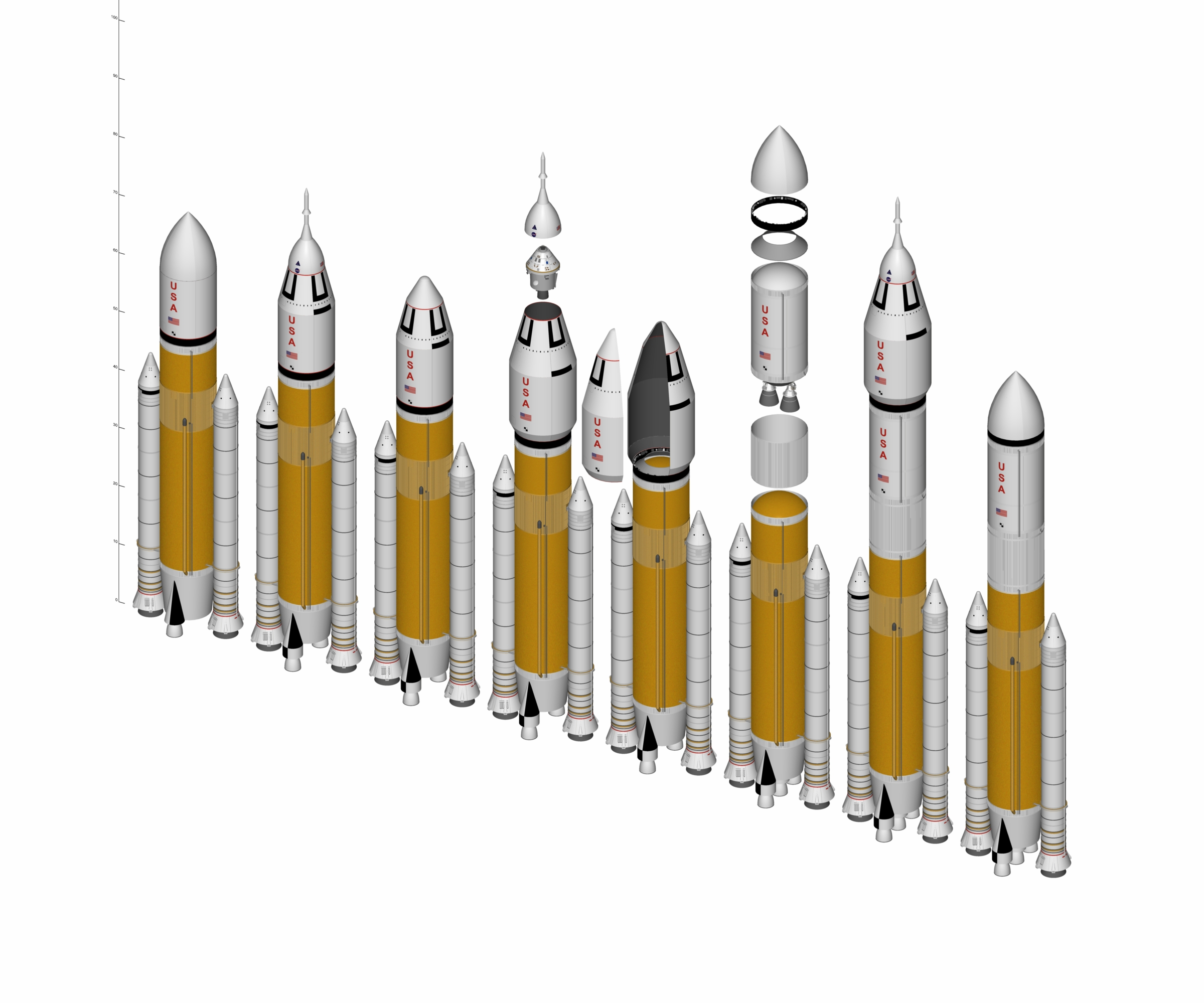
Possible configurations of the Jupiter launch vehicle family.

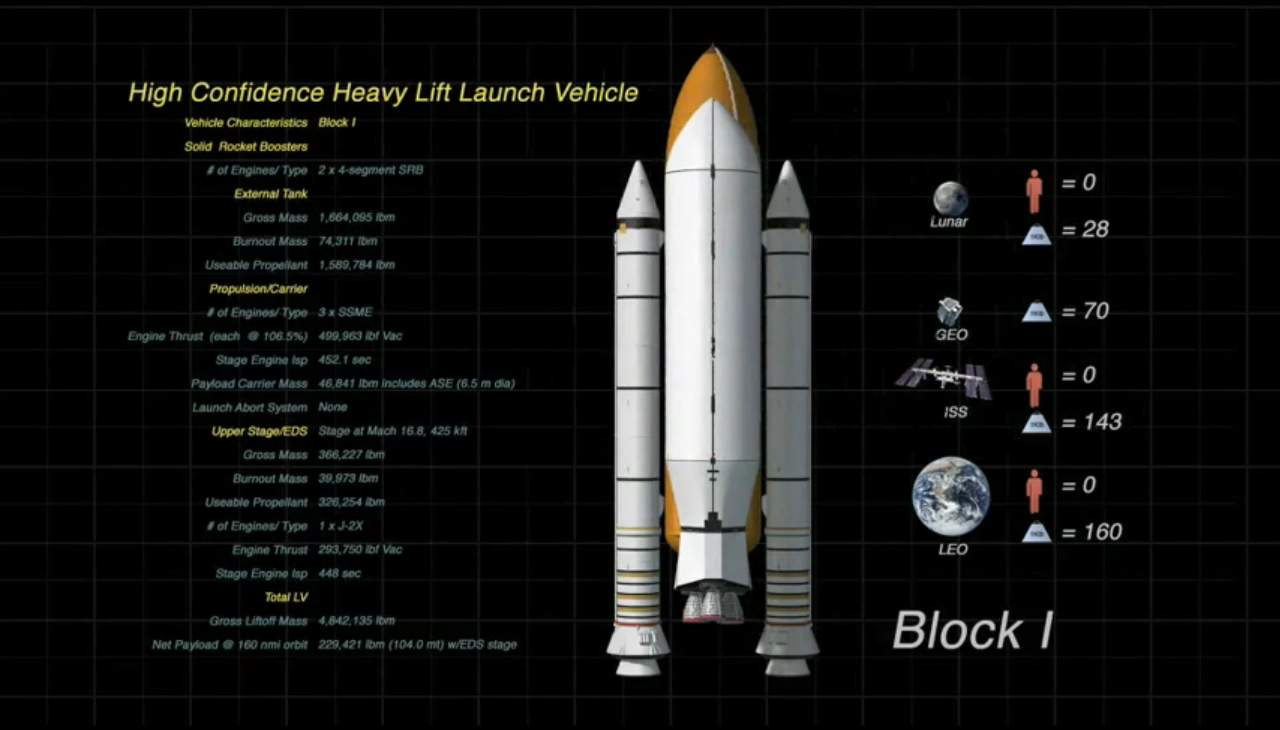
A diagram of the Shuttle-Derived Heavy Lift Launch Vehicle.

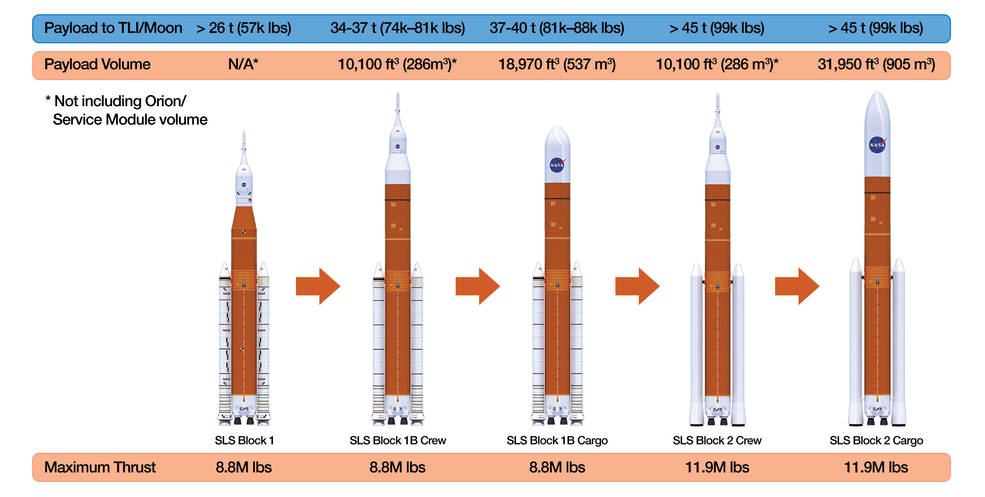
Planned evolution of the Space Launch System.

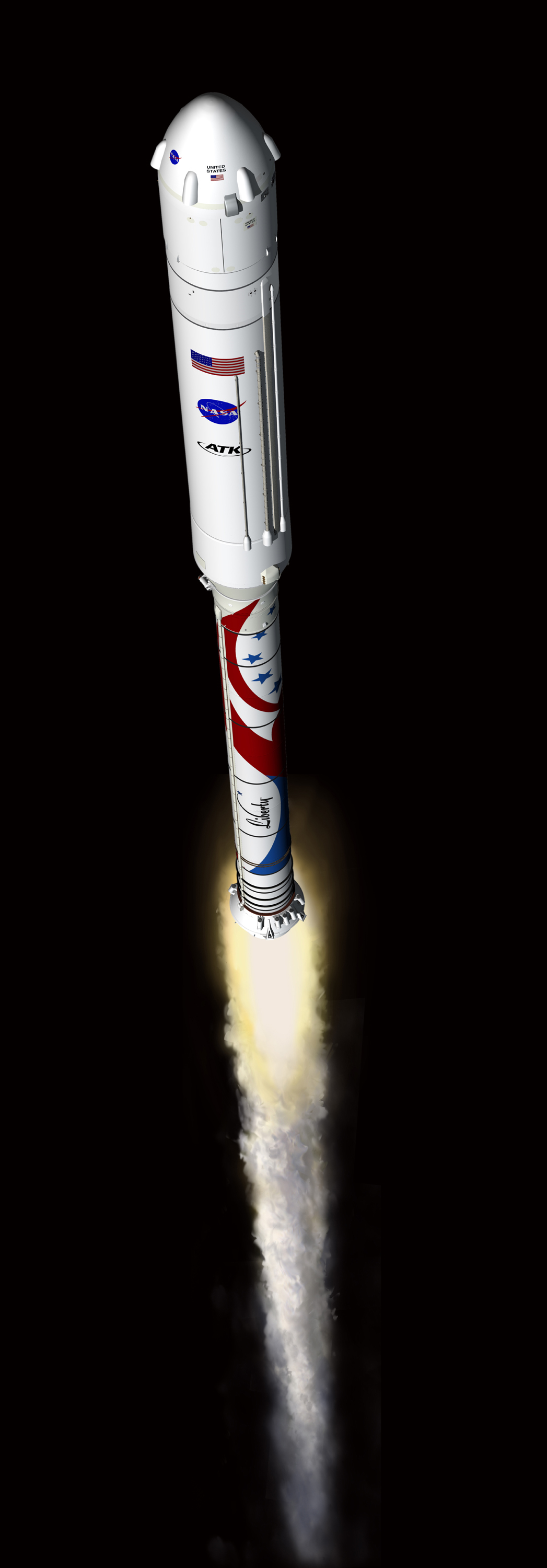
Artist's concept of the Liberty launch vehicle.

== Bibliography ==
- Boeing (c. 2005), "Delta IV Heavy growth options for space exploration", Delta Launch 310 – Delta IV Heavy Demo Media Kit (PDF), archived from the original (PDF) on February 3, 2007
- Bush, George H. W. (1991), National Space Launch Strategy NSPD-4, July 10, 1991, archived from the original on December 30, 1999
- Duffy, J. B.; Lehner, J. W.; Pannell, B. (1993). "Evaluation of the national launch system as a booster for the HL-20". Journal of Spacecraft and Rockets. 30 (5): 622. Bibcode:1993JSpRo..30..622D. doi:10.2514/3.25574.
- Federation of American Scientists (1996), National Launch System - NLS
- Flight International (August 28 – September 3, 1991), "NASA Sets up 10-month NLS study", Flight International, 4 (4282)
- Lyons, Michael T. (1992), "National launch system and its potential application to the launch of geosynchronous satellites." (PDF), AIAA International Communication Satellite Systems Conference and Exhibit, 14th, Washington, D. C., March 22-26, 1992, Technical Papers. Pt. 1 (A92-29751 11-32)., American Institute of Aeronautics and Astronautics, pp. 18–22, archived from the original (PDF) on August 10, 2015
- NASA History Division (September 23, 1998), "The Policy Origins of the X-33 Part II: The NASA Access to Space Study", X-33 History Project, National Aeronautics and Space Administration, archived from the original on October 22, 2014
- Thompson, Elvia; Davis, Jennifer (November 4, 2009), Daniel Saul Goldin NASA Administrator, April 1, 1992 - November 17, 2001, National Aeronautics and Space Administration, archived from the original on December 8, 2016
- Wood, B. K. (2002), "Propulsion for the 21st Century—RS-68", 38th Joint Liquid Propulsion Conference, Indianapolis, Indiana. July 2002. Reston, Virginia, USA., American Institute of Aeronautics and Astronautics, archived from the original on March 19, 2009
