= First Lunar Outpost =

1989 Bush administration proposal to place humans on the Moon

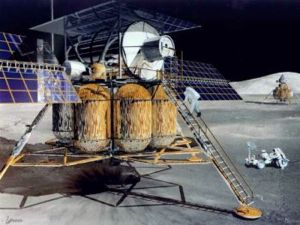

Program overview
- Country: United States
- Organization: NASA
- Purpose: Crewed lunar exploration
- Status: Proposed and cancelled

Program history
- Cost: Cost Estimate (1992) Total Development: US$12.8 billion: HLLV Development= $4.8 billion; Spacecraft & Facilities Development= $6 billion; Surface Systems Development= $0.5 billion; Surface Habitat= $1.5 billion; Total Production: $12.2 billion: HLLV Production (3 Vehicles)= $7.8 billion; Crewed Spacecraft Production (x 1)= $1.4 billion; Uncrewed Lander Production (x 2)= $1 billion; Cargo Production Cost (~68t)= $2 billion
- Duration: Study: 1992-1993
- First flight: 2011
- Launch site: Kennedy Space Center

Vehicle information
- Crewed vehicle: "Eagle" Direct Ascent Vehicle
- Launch vehicle: Comet HLLV

First Lunar Outpost was a proposal for a crewed lunar mission that would have launched sometime in the 2010s. It was part of George H. W. Bush's Space Exploration Initiative. The main purpose of the proposal was to offer a much less expensive alternative to NASA's 90-day study from 1989 by a factor of US$30 billion. Although it did not gather much mainstream attention, NASA dedicated much time to assembling a detailed and thorough proposal. However, the entire Space Exploration Initiative was cancelled soon after the proposal's completion, and NASA closed the Office of Space Exploration in March 1993.

== Overview ==
The First Lunar Outpost (FLO) was the most comprehensive moonbase study under the Space Exploration Initiative (SEI). It was intended to be the flagship of the program from which other proposals such as ILREC would have to compete. The FLO concept incorporated many recommendations from the 1991 Stafford Synthesis report, mainly the use of a Nova class super heavy launch vehicle to minimize assembly and operations in low Earth orbit and on the surface of the Moon. FLO was a major change from previous SEI proposals as the vehicle was standalone and expendable rather than reusable and being staged off of Space Station Freedom (later known as the International Space Station). The design was based on of massive yet simple launchers to carry massive payloads at once rather than many small and complicated launches. This was to reduce cost and development time. The program would have almost completely consisted of existing technology such as the Saturn and Space Station with only the landing vehicle needing to be developed.

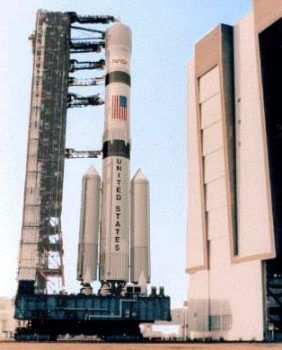
The Comet HLV

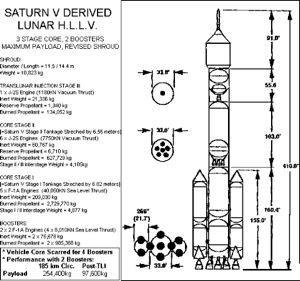
The Saturn V derived HLV "Comet"

== Launch vehicle ==
Based on the recommendations of the Stafford Synthesis report, FLO would have relied on a massive Saturn-derived launch vehicle known as the Comet. The Comet would have been capable of injecting 254.4 tons into low Earth orbit and 97.6 tons on a TLI, making it one of the most capable vehicles ever designed. NASA's Marshall Space Flight Center looked into the Comet rocket or a possible configuration of the then-in-development National Launch System with four F-1A boosters added to the basic 2-stage NLS vehicle. The Saturn V derived design consisted of a standard Saturn V but with a new third stage, stretched first and second stages, and new F-1 side boosters. The engines would be updated to the newer F-1A and J-2S variants. Development costs were expected to be low since most of it would just be resurrecting manufacturing hardware from Apollo.

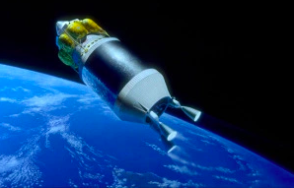
Nuclear lunar injection stage

A nuclear powered variant of the third stage was also considered. It would use two 222.5 KN-thrust engines and would have reduced the size and weight of both the lunar injection stage and the rest of the launch vehicle. The baseline study used the chemical engines instead due to the fact that they would cost $2 billion less to develop. The nuclear option would be developed later on to support crewed mars missions. Both Boeing's SEI contractor studies and the Stafford Synthesis report recommended that NASA invest in nuclear propulsion technology. NASA's Lewis Research Center established a Nuclear Systems Office to develop and test a fully functional engine by 2005. This along with the military's Timberwind project revived the U.S. nuclear propulsion program for the first time since NERVA's cancellation in the 1970s.

== Lander ==
The landing vehicle was designed to be as simple and easy to operate as possible. It would weigh 93,526 kg (103 tons) and be powered by four RL10 engines. When fully deployed its landing legs would stretch to 18.8 meters wide and would stand 14.1 meters tall. Each FLO crewed flight would only require one launch and one vehicle. The Comet would send the lander on a trajectory to the lunar surface where it would then use its engines to brake and land. From the surface, the ascent vehicle would carry the crew capsule directly back to Earth. This was similar to the early Apollo direct ascent.

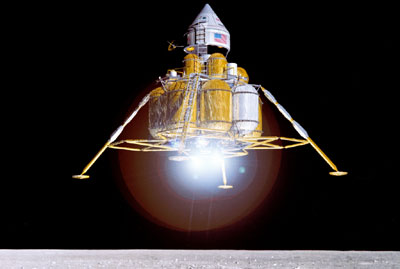
The lunar lander during final descent

=== Descent stage ===
It weighed 44,151 kg (dry mass 12,992 kg) and would be able to carry 5,000 kg of equipment and cargo along with its 18,077 kg earth return stage. The descent stage would be used to break into lunar orbit and later deorbit the vehicle for landing. It would be self-guided and not require crewed piloting.

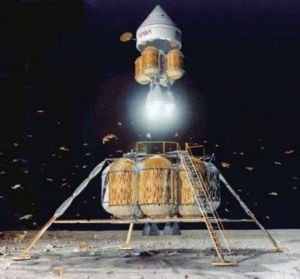
The earth return stage taking off

=== Ascent stage ===
Astronauts would ride in a scaled-up Apollo capsule, it would be about 5% bigger. This would allow it to carry a crew of four on their four-day transit to the surface. The vehicle would land automatically because the astronauts had no view of the surface to pilot it. The earth return would use three engines and would use hypergolic fuels for safety reasons. Astronauts would descend from the crew capsule down a ladder to a platform before going down a stair ladder to the surface.

=== Uncrewed cargo variant ===
The uncrewed cargo lander would be used to transport massive amounts of material to the lunar surface in order to construct a surface outpost. It would carry the initial habitat module before the first crewed mission and would later be used to carry rovers and other habitats to the surface. The uncrewed version could deliver a 35,894 kg payload to the lunar surface. This would be helpful when delivering the station-derived habitat module. Later missions would bring in-situ resource utilization (ISRU) equipment to test it on the lunar surface before sending the technology to Mars.

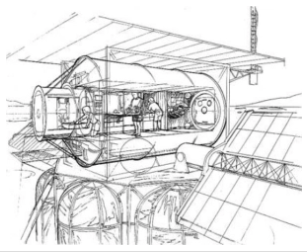
Sketch of the surface habitat

== Station derived habitat ==
The habitat module would weigh 35.9 tons and cost $470 million to develop. It was a modified version of the standard Space Station Freedom habitat and laboratory design. It would not need any additional setup after landing and would be able to self-deploy its 20 KW solar array and perform its own system check. It would serve as a life science and soil analysis lab. It could be visited by crews for up to 45 days at intervals of every six months. Later expeditions could expand the base to accommodate more crew and eventually be permanently crewed or use the site as a proving ground for deep space technology.

== Surface operations ==
The landing site for FLO was to be Mare Smythii, near the equator on the eastern limb. This initial landing site was used as a design reference to demonstrate what an optimal mission would look like. The team evaluated other landing sites to see how flexible the design was. They concluded that: "except for some specialized sites, such as the lunar poles, the bottoms of craters or other unusual terrain, the mission science payload and the EVA activities would not change much from site to site. The actual landing site would be decided by a scientific committee over the course of many months."

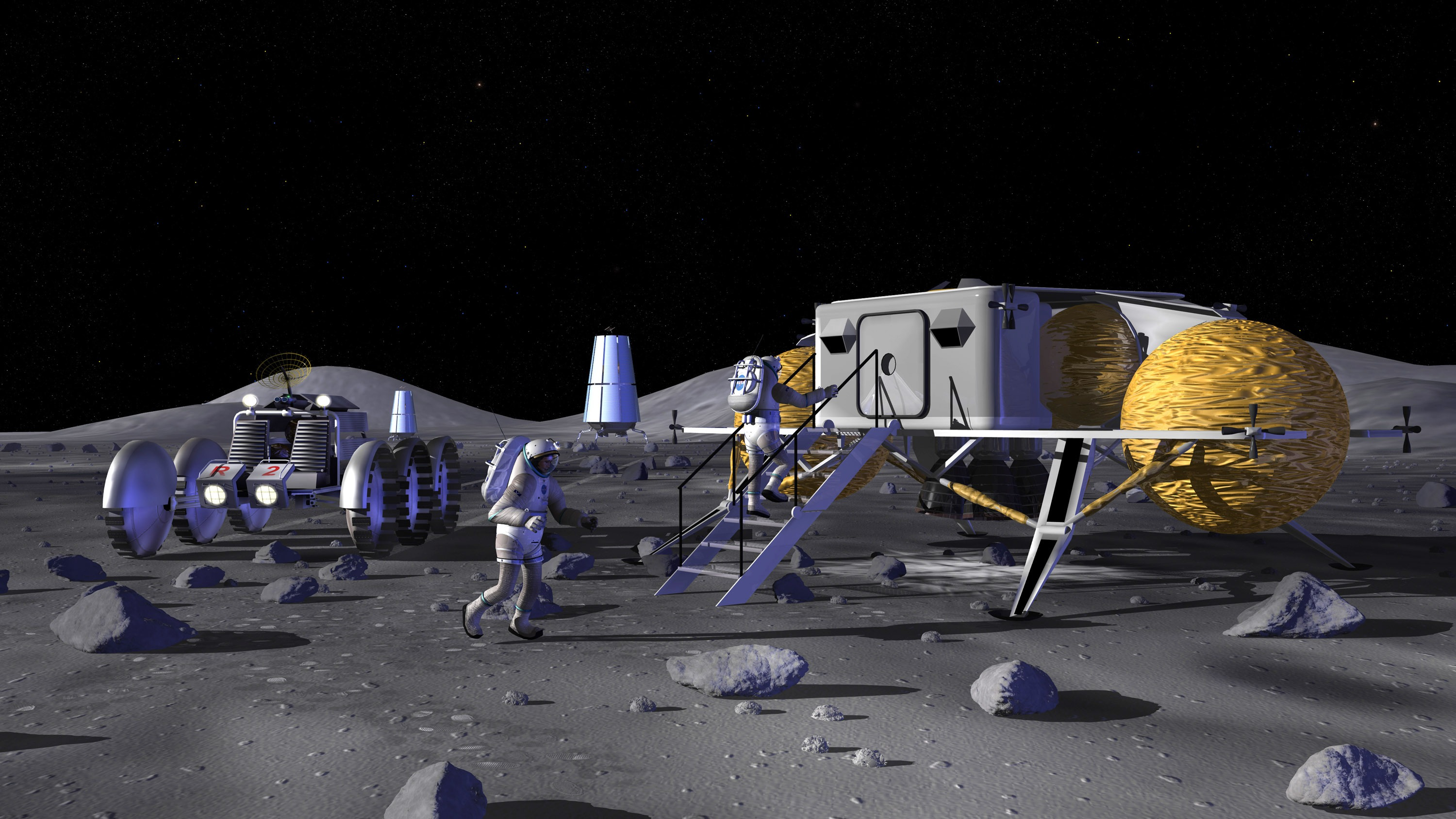
An earlier lunar base design from FLO's precursor in the 90-day study

Once on the surface, the crew would perform nine traverses using a 4-man unpressurized rover. Each traverse would drive out to a maximum range of 25 km and they would visit major geographical features and gathering data about the area. Each traverse was divided into segments suitable for one eight-hour EVA on the rover. Mission planners hoped five or six traverses could be completed each mission. The remaining uncompleted traverses would be left to a future mission.

Mission designers decided on four major disciplines that surface teams would focus on during the mission: astronomy, geophysics, life sciences, and space and solar systems physics. The astronauts would also deploy several "set and forget" standalone science payloads. These payloads were:

- Geophysical Monitoring Package
- Solar System Physics Experiment Package
- Traverse Geophysical Package
- Lunar Geologic Tool Set
- Lunar Transit Telescope
- Small Solar Telescope
- Robotic Package for Rover
- Life Science Package

The heaviest of these payloads would be the In-Situ Resource Utilization (ISRU) Demonstration Package. It consisted of several experiments for the astronauts to demonstrate the use of resources on the Moon such as heating lunar regolith to extract oxygen, which would also be the main objective of the next proposed lunar mission ILREC. The main focus of this was to test the technology which would be vital for crewed missions to Mars.

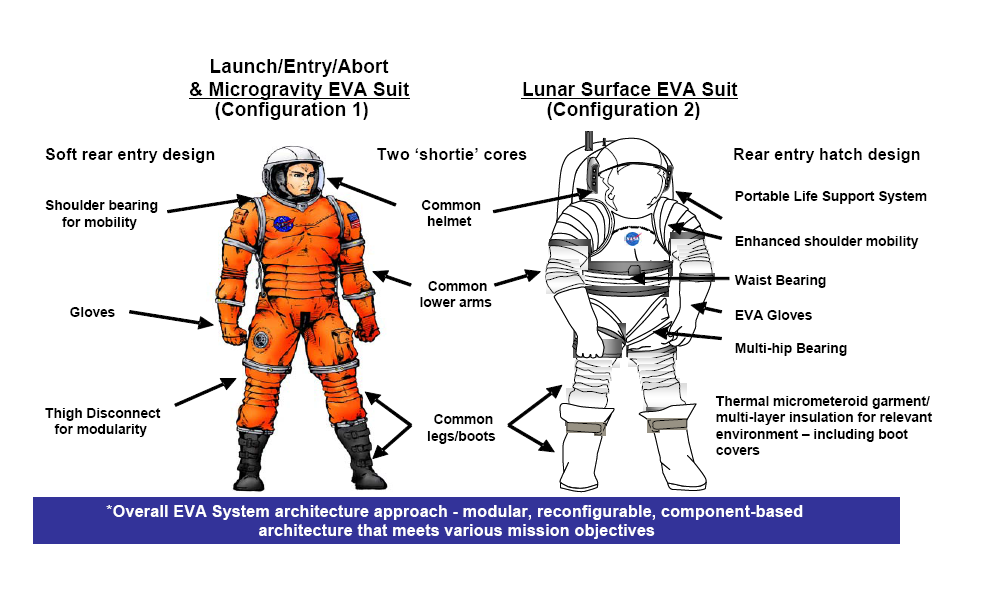
Future EVA suits would match the requirements of the FLO space suits

The second mission would focus less on exploration and more on setting up additional research equipment as well as tending to the outpost. The main focus of the crew would be drilling on the surface using a 10-meter drill to extract resources and samples. They would also begin deploying a radio telescope array and revisit the optical telescope site and switch detectors as an operational test.

The mission would require newer updated EVA suits that were more comfortable, had better mobility, and were easier to manage. The existing Shuttle EVA Suits required much maintenance and astronauts needed to pre-breathe oxygen in order to avoid the bends as a result of nitrogen bubbling in the bloodstream. This pre-breathing technique would be too time-consuming and would make things like emergency EVAs impossible.

== Early Lunar Access pathfinder program ==
A precursor program called Early Lunar Access would have run during the early 2000s and used Ariane rockets and Space Shuttles to operate a low-cost lunar exploration infrastructure. It would be a joint NASA and ESA mission and serve as a testing ground for FLO. It would use the same crew capsule but a smaller landing vehicle capable of supporting a crew of 2. The Space Shuttle would carry the Lunar Exploration Vehicle while the Ariane 5 (or Titan IV) would carry a wide bodied Centaur G rocket stage. Both payloads would rendezvous and dock in low Earth orbit. The Centaur would fire its engine to accelerate the craft on a trajectory to the lunar surface. To save fuel, the LEV would make a direct landing rather than entering a parking orbit. Once the surface mission is complete, the vehicle would separate two large spherical drop tanks and ascend directly to Earth, once again skipping low lunar orbit.

In order to achieve the payload capacity required for this mission, the Ariane 5 would need an additional two solid rocket boosters (SRBs) and the Space Shuttle would need the lightweight Al-Li External Tank or Advanced Solid Rocket Motors (ASRMs) to carry 25,720-kg payloads to a 300-km orbit. The new external tank was eventually manufactured but the ASRMs were cancelled in 1994. The Centaur G would be modified to last 10 days in orbit rather than a few hours. The crew capsule would be the same upscaled Apollo capsule used on FLO but would only need to support a crew of two which meant it could carry extra supplies and payload.

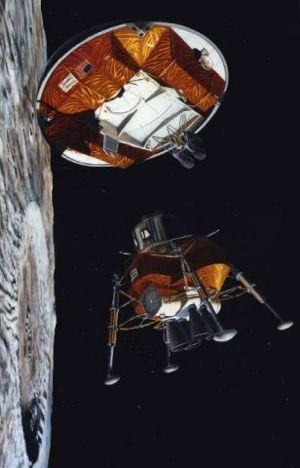
The Eagle Engineering reusable lander

== Cancellation of SEI ==
On April 1, 1992 Dan Goldin became NASA Administrator, and during his tenure near-term human exploration beyond Earth orbit was abandoned, and the "faster, better, cheaper" strategy was applied to space science robotic exploration.

When the White House National Science and Technology Council released their revision of the National Space Policy in September 1996, it specifically lacked any mention of human space exploration beyond Earth's orbit. The next day, President Clinton stated on a campaigning trip through the American Pacific Northwest that a human mission to Mars was too expensive and instead affirmed America's commitment to a series of less expensive probes, thus removing human exploration from the national agenda.

== See also ==
- Artemis program
- Space Exploration Initiative
- International Lunar Resources Exploration Concept
- In situ resource utilization
- Lunar resources
- Moon Treaty
