= International Lunar Resources Exploration Concept =

Lunar exploration concept

International Lunar Resources Exploration Concept (ILREC)
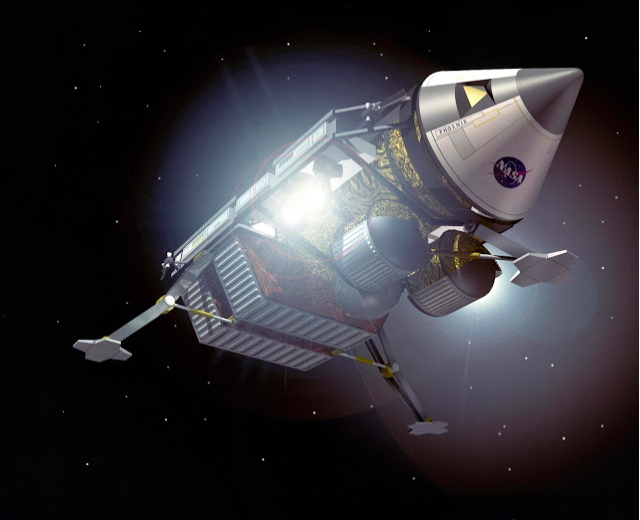

Program overview
- Country: United States; Soviet Union
- Organization: NASA and Roscosmos
- Purpose: Crewed lunar exploration
- Status: Cancelled in concept phase

Program history
- Cost: $500 billion over 30 years
- Duration: Study: 1993-1994
- First flight: Phase 1 Flight 1
- First crewed flight: Phase 1 Flight 4
- Launch sites: Cape Canaveral; Kennedy Space Center; Baikonur Cosmodrome

Vehicle information
- Crewed vehicle: ILREC Piloted Lander
- Launch vehicle: Shuttle-C Energia

The International Lunar Resources Exploration Concept (ILREC) was a proposed mission architecture under President George H. W. Bush's Space Exploration Initiative (SEI) designed by Kent Joosten, an engineer at NASA's Johnson Space Center. The plan would have used the help of international partners, mainly the Soviet Union, to assemble a lunar base and sustainable lunar transportation service.

== Space Exploration Initiative ==
On July 20, 1989, the 20th anniversary of the Apollo 11 Moon landing, George H. W. Bush — then President of the United States — announced plans for what came to be known as the Space Exploration Initiative (SEI). In a speech on the steps of the National Air and Space Museum he described plans calling for constructing Space Station Freedom, sending humans back to the Moon "to stay" and ultimately sending astronauts to explore Mars. He proposed not a 10-year Apollo-style plan, but a long-range continuing commitment based on the three above elements, ending with "a journey into tomorrow – a journey to another planet – a manned mission to Mars." The President noted it was humanity's destiny to explore, and America's destiny to lead. He asked Vice President Dan Quayle to lead the National Space Council in determining what was needed to carry out these missions in terms of money, manpower and technology.

A 90-Day Study estimated SEI's long-term cost at approximately 500 billion dollars spread over 20 to 30 years. According to Steve Dick, NASA Chief Historian, the National Academy of Sciences largely concurred with the NASA study, but White House and Congressional reaction to the NASA plan was hostile, primarily due to the cost estimate. In particular, Democratic members of Congress had almost immediate criticism over Bush's plan. Chairman of the Budget Committee, Senator Jim Sasser, stated "The President took one giant leap for starry-eyed political rhetoric, and not even a small step for fiscal responsibility. The hard fact is, this Administration doesn't even have its space priorities established for next year, much less for the next century." His fellow Tennessee Senator Al Gore also was quoted expressing his criticism of Bush's plan, saying "By proposing a return to the Moon, with no money, no timetable, and no plan, President Bush offers the country not a challenge to inspire us, but a daydream to briefly entertain us, a daydream about as splashy as a George Lucas movie, with about as much connection to reality." President Bush sought international partners, but the program was thought too expensive even for an international endeavor.

In the event, execution of the initiative was assigned to NASA, but the initiative did not survive long into the administration of the next president, Bill Clinton.

== Vehicles ==
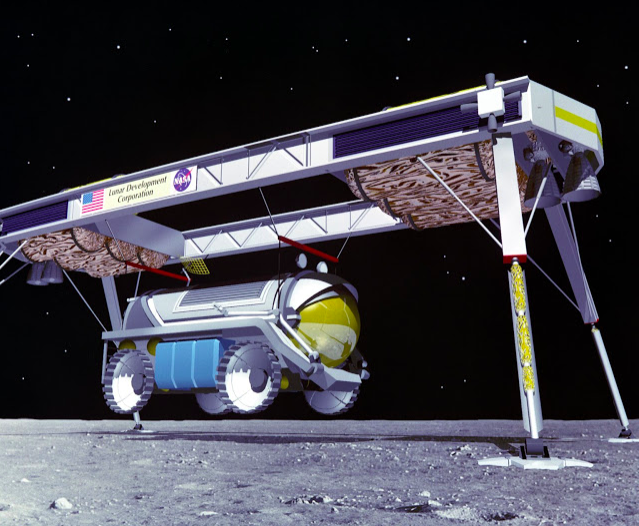
Automated Cargo Vehicle Unloading Moon Bus

The plan would utilize multiple lunar surface rendezvous (LSR), where vehicles would meet on the surface for refueling, rather than Apollo's Lunar orbit rendezvous (LOR). NASA's Jet Propulsion Laboratory proposed a LSR for Apollo but it was quickly turned down to the amount of technology, such as In situ resource utilization, that would need to be developed.

=== One-way Automated Cargo Vehicle ===
The lander would have a rectangular structure which would include fuel tanks and engine blocks towards each end of the vehicle. The middle section would be empty and hold payloads which could be deployed on the surface. They would be capable of delivering 11 tons of payloads. They would be designed and built by NASA and launched by Soviet Energia rockets. They would be assembled in the U.S. and shipped to Russia in C-5 Galaxy or Antonov-124/225 transport airplanes. They would then be shipped to Baikonur Cosmodrome and launched there.

=== ILREC Piloted Lander ===
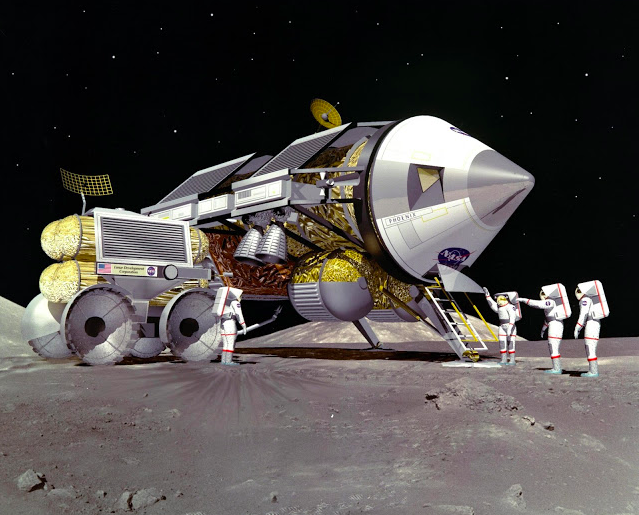
ILREC Piloted Lander

The crew lander design was a mix between a traditional lander and an orbital capsule. The crew compartment would be derived from the Apollo CM but would lack a forward docking port. It would be mounted to the front of a horizontally oriented three legged lander. The landing legs would fold against the lander's underside inside of a streamlined shroud during ascent aboard a Shuttle-C or another Shuttle-Derived Launch Vehicle like the then under development National Launch System.

The vehicle would have a hatch that would face downward just in front of the landing leg. It would provide access to the surface via a ladder on the leg. On the launch pad this hatch would allow access to the vehicle. The windows would be inset into the hull and allow crew to view the lunar surface. The craft would land and launch using the same belly-mounted thrusters and act as a direct ascent vehicle.

During descent to the lunar surface, the engines would burn Earth oxygen and hydrogen. Soon after lunar touchdown, the lander would be reloaded with liquid oxygen from the automated lunar oxygen plant.

During ascent, the spacecraft would burn Earth-made hydrogen and lunar-made oxygen. The entire lander would lift into a lunar parking orbit and eventually power itself onto a return trajectory.

The crew capsule would separate from the powered stage and orientate itself for reentry similar to the Apollo capsule with its heat shield towards the atmosphere. The capsule would deploy a steerable parasail parachute for a land recovery, potentially at Kennedy Space Center. The lander section would burn up in the atmosphere.

=== Pressurized Moon Bus rover ===
The Moon Bus would have been a large rover designed to accommodate 2 passengers for days or weeks at a time. At least two of these rovers would be positioned at the temporary outpost and would act as crew quarters and mobile labs. The 4-person crew would divide into teams of 2, each stationed to one rover, and would depart the outpost on separate missions. The rovers would also be used as early habitation before the outpost was assembled

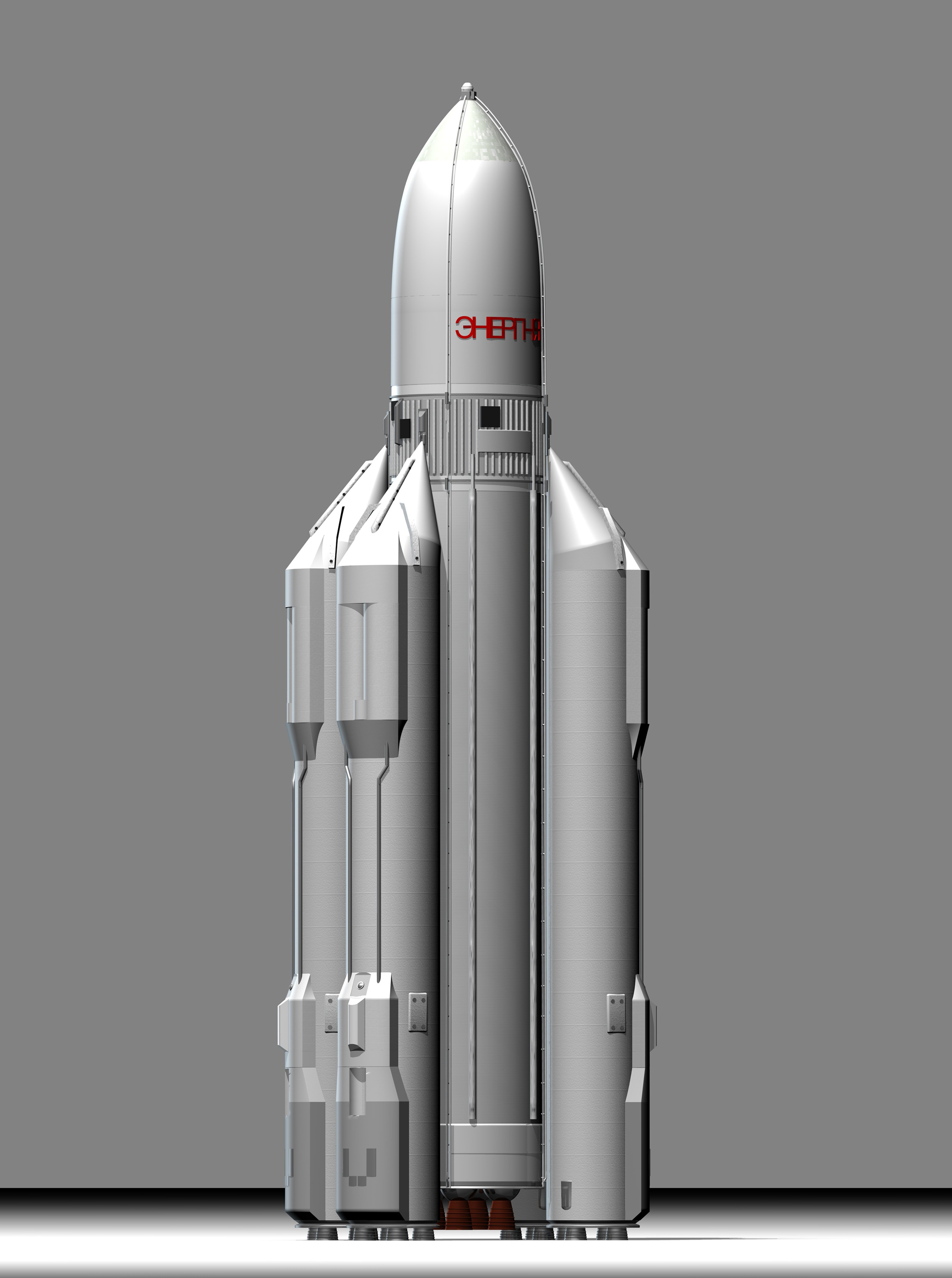
Energia Rocket

=== Energia ===
Energia (Russian: Энергия, Energiya, "Energy") (GRAU 11K25) was a Soviet rocket that was designed by NPO Energia to serve as a heavy-lift partially recoverable launch system for a variety of payloads including the Buran spacecraft. Control system main developer enterprise was the Khartron NPO "Electropribor". The Energia used four strap-on boosters each powered by a four-chamber RD-170 engine burning kerosene/LOX, and a central core stage with 4 one-chamber RD-0120 (11D122) engines fueled by liquid hydrogen/LOX.

The launch system had two functionally different operational variants: Energia-Polyus, the initial test configuration, in which the Polyus system was used as a final stage to put the payload into orbit, and Energia-Buran, in which the Buran spacecraft was the payload and the source of the orbit insertion impulse.

The rocket had the capacity to place about 100 tonnes in Low Earth orbit, up to 20 tonnes to geostationary orbit and up to 32 tonnes via translunar trajectory into lunar orbit.

The rocket made just two flights to orbit, one each in 1987 and 1988.

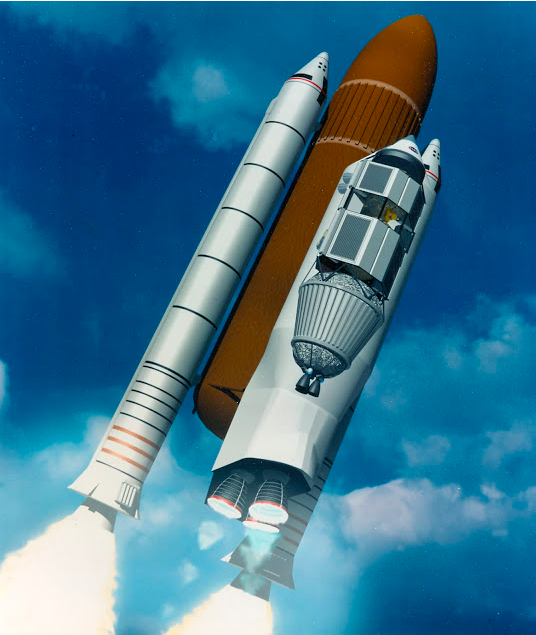
Shuttle-C with ILREC Piloted Lander

=== Shuttle-C ===
The Shuttle-C was a study by NASA to turn the Space Shuttle launch stack into a dedicated uncrewed cargo launcher. The Space Shuttle external tank and Space Shuttle Solid Rocket Boosters (SRBs) would be combined with a cargo module that take the place of the shuttle orbiter and include the Space Shuttle Main Engines. Various Shuttle-C concepts were investigated between 1984 and 1995.

The Shuttle-C concept would theoretically cut development costs for a heavy launch vehicle by re-using technology developed for the shuttle program. End-of-life and space Shuttle hardware would also have been used. One proposal even involved converting the Columbia or Enterprise into a single-use cargo launcher. Before the loss of Space Shuttle Challenger, NASA had expected about 14 shuttle flights a year. In the aftermath of the Challenger incident, it became clear that this launch rate was not feasible for a variety of reasons. With the Shuttle-C, it was thought that the lower maintenance and safety requirements for the uncrewed vehicle would allow a higher flight rate.

In the early 1990s, NASA engineers planning a crewed mission to Mars included a Shuttle-C design to launch six non reusable 80 ton segments to create two Mars ships in Earth orbit. After President George W. Bush called for the end of the Space Shuttle by 2010, these proposed configurations were put aside.

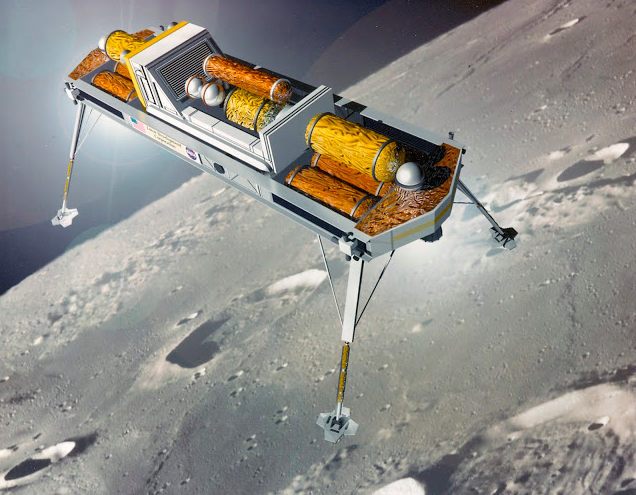
Automated Cargo Vehicle

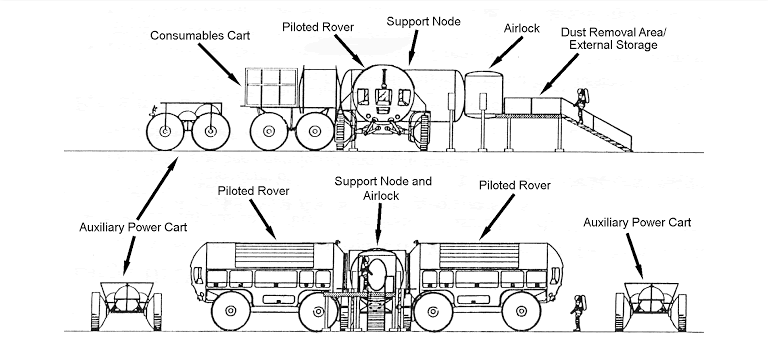
Temporary Lunar Outpost Layout

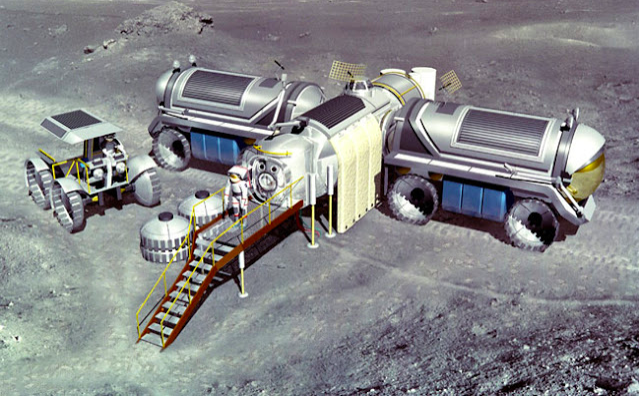
Temporary Lunar Outpost

== Mission concept ==
=== Phase 1 ===
Phase 1 would have been mostly robotic missions that would have set up the liquid oxygen plants for the crew's return trip. Flights 1 and 2 would have assembled the oxygen plant and ISRU equipment as well as small rover-like "carts" that would have carried logistics and fuel cell power. Flight 3 would have brought equipment for the astronauts such as the pressurized Moon Bus and scientific equipment. Flight 4 would have flown a crew of two in the ILREC Piloted Lander and landed them at the outpost. The crew would be one astronaut and one cosmonaut. Their stay would only be a few days long.

Phase 1
Mission	Launch vehicle	Landing vehicle	Crew	Objective
Flight 1	Energia	One-way Automated Cargo Vehicle	N/A	Deliver the nuclear reactor on a teleoperated cart and the automated liquid oxygen production facility (the latter would remain attached to its lander)
Flight 2	Energia	One-way Automated Cargo Vehicle	N/A	Deliver teleoperated diggers, regolith haulers, oxygen tankers, and carts for auxiliary fuel-cell power and consumables resupply
Flight 3	Energia	One-way Automated Cargo Vehicle	N/A	Deliver a pressurized Moon Bus rover and science equipment for future astronauts
Flight 4	Shuttle C	ILREC Piloted Lander	Two	Deliver first crew consisting of an astronaut and cosmonaut

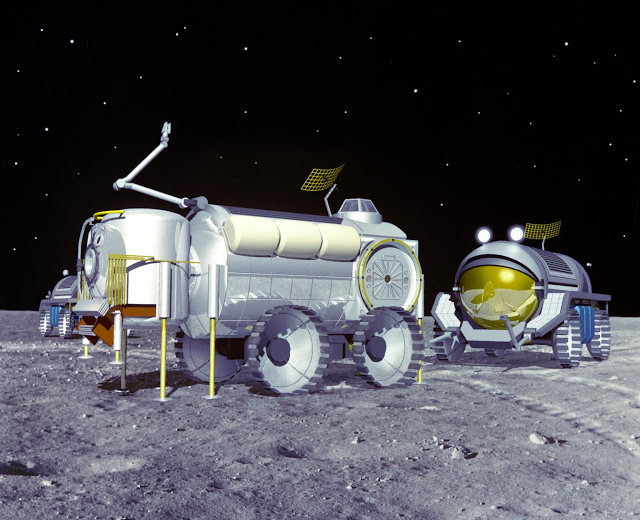
Lunar support module and a Moon Bus rover

=== Phase 2 ===
Phase 2 would have set up advanced equipment for further exploration and the first long-term mission. Flights 1-3 would have delivered another Moon Bus rover and scientific equipment, a rover support module with airlocks and habitat space, and a pressurized crew module with logistics mounted on wheels. Flight 4 would have carried a half astronaut half cosmonaut crew of four to the surface. The crew would divide up into two teams with each one stationed at one of the Moon Buses. The mission would last six weeks.

Phase 2
Mission	Launch vehicle	Landing vehicle	Crew	Objective
Flight 1	Energia	One-way Automated Cargo Vehicle	N/A	Deliver a second pressurized Moon Bus rover and science equipment for future astronauts
Flight 2	Energia	One-way Automated Cargo Vehicle	N/A	Deliver a rover support module with an airlock and habitation space
Flight 3	Energia	One-way Automated Cargo Vehicle	N/A	Deliver a cart mounted pressurized space station derived module with consumables and other logisitics and scientific equipment
Flight 4	Shuttle C	ILREC Piloted Lander	Four	Deliver first long-term crew consisting of astronauts and cosmonauts for a six-week lunar stay

== See also ==
- Artemis program
- In situ resource utilization
- Lunar resources
- Moon Treaty
- First Lunar Outpost
