= Comet HLLV =

Proposed NASA launch vehicle

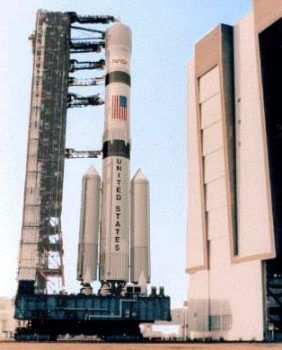
- Artist's impression of a Comet HLLV being rolled out of the VAB
- Function: Crew / Cargo Launch Vehicle
- Country of origin: United States

Size
- Height: 410 ft (120 m)
- Diameter: 11.5 m (38 ft)
- Stages: 3

Capacity

Payload to LEO
- Mass: 254,400 kg (560,900 lb)

Payload to TLI
- Mass: 60,600–97,600 kg (133,600–215,200 lb)

Launch history
- Status: Proposed and cancelled
- Launch sites: Kennedy Space Center

Boosters
- Height: 155 ft (47 m)
- Diameter: 260 in (6,600 mm)
- Empty mass: 75,678 kg (166,841 lb)
- Propellant mass: 985,368 kg (2,172,365 lb)
- Powered by: 2 Rocketdyne F-1A
- Maximum thrust: 16,013 kN (3,600,000 lbf)each on sea level
- Propellant: RP-1/LOX

First stage
- Height: 160.4 ft (48.9 m)
- Diameter: 33.0 ft (10.1 m)
- Empty mass: 209,030 kg (460,830 lb)
- Propellant mass: 2,729,770 kg (6,018,110 lb)
- Powered by: 5 Rocketdyne F-1A
- Maximum thrust: 40,050 kN (9,000,000 lbf) sea level
- Propellant: RP-1/LOX

Second stage
- Height: 103 ft (31 m)
- Diameter: 33.0 ft (10.1 m)
- Empty mass: 60,767 kg (133,968 lb)
- Propellant mass: 634,439 kg (1,398,699 lb)
- Powered by: 6 Rocketdyne J-2S
- Maximum thrust: 7,750 kN (1,740,000 lbf) vacuum
- Propellant: LH2/LOX

Translunar Injection stage
- Height: 55.6 ft (16.9 m)
- Diameter: 33.0 ft (10.1 m)
- Empty mass: 21,336 kg (47,038 lb)
- Propellant mass: 135,392 kg (298,488 lb)
- Powered by: 1 Rocketdyne J-2S
- Maximum thrust: 1,180 kN (270,000 lbf) vacuum
- Propellant: LH2/LOX

The Comet HLLV was a proposed super heavy-lift launch vehicle designed for NASA's First Lunar Outpost program, which was in the design phase from 1992 to 1993 under the Space Exploration Initiative. It was a Saturn V-derived launch vehicle with modernized engines, stretched fuel tanks, and strap-on boosters. Its main goal was to support the First Lunar Outpost program and future human mission to Mars. It was designed to be inexpensive and simple while relying on existing technology to lower development costs.

== Design ==
The Comet would have been capable of putting 254.4 tons into low Earth orbit and 97.6 tons to trans-lunar injection, roughly twice that of the Saturn V, making it one of the largest rockets ever designed in terms of payload. The vehicle resembled a Saturn V, but with stretched first and second stages, an increased-diameter third stage, and new side boosters. Additionally, the engines were updated to the F-1A and J-2S, and a sixth engine was added to the second stage. Each of the two side boosters had two F-1A engines. Development costs were expected to be modest due to reliance on Apollo-era technology.

A nuclear-powered variant of the third stage, with two 222.5-kN engines, was also considered. It would have reduced the rocket's size, but at a predicted development cost of $2 billion over a chemical-only design. The nuclear option was planned to be developed later to support crewed Mars missions. To this end, NASA's Lewis Research Center established a Nuclear Systems Office to develop and test a fully functional nuclear engine by 2005.

=== NLS derived launch vehicle ===
An alternate version of the launcher based on the then-in-development National Launch System was proposed. NASA's Marshall Spaceflight Center looked into the Comet rocket or a possible configuration with four F-1A boosters added to the basic 2-stage NLS vehicle. The main expected advantage was that the vehicle could rely on technology currently flying rather than having to resurrect 20 year old technology and manufacturing equipment.
