= Decadal Planning Team =

The NASA Decadal Planning Team (DPT) and its successor, the NASA Exploration Team (NExT), were influential behind-the-scenes efforts to develop a major new direction for the space agency early in the 21st century.

DPT was quietly chartered in spring, 1999, by then-NASA Administrator Daniel Goldin, in coordination with the White House Office of Management and Budget, and led jointly by the NASA Headquarters Offices of Human Spaceflight and Space Science. It was created to generate and assess internally for NASA's most senior leadership innovative concepts and options that merged human and robotic space exploration. Specifically, the team developed options that could achieve major scientific goals over the subsequent 20 years using advanced technologies and taking advantage of the capabilities that astronauts made available on site.

== Origins ==
Through the 1980s and 1990s, NASA was often criticized for having relatively unimpressive and uncompelling long-term plans for human spaceflight, although the Space Shuttle, the International Space Station, and servicing missions to the Hubble Space Telescope programs were notable engineering and management achievements. At the same time, NASA's science programs – especially, the space sciences – were widely regarded as successful examples of long-range planning and execution: the robotic Mars and outer Solar System missions, as well as the space astronomy programs. As a consequence, NASA Administrator Goldin, working with Agency senior leadership, created the Decadal Planning Team of about a dozen senior scientists, engineers, astronauts, and managers from its headquarters and all its centers. The activity was led from the start by Dr. James B. Garvin and Ms. Lisa Guerra.

In contrast with numerous earlier – and subsequent – long-range planning teams that NASA chartered, the DPT avoided identifying a specific, overriding destination for human spaceflight (e.g., the Moon, Mars, asteroids, Lagrangian points). Instead, the DPT emphasized (mainly) technological ‘’capabilities’’ that would be required for humans to travel throughout the inner Solar System to achieve multiple goals. The DPT was unique in NASA’s history in advocating the concept that specific destinations were not terminal venues, but rather should be treated primarily as ‘’stepping stones’’ -- sites for limited testing and demonstration before moving on to other locations of greater interest. Such a ‘’go anywhere, anytime’’ philosophy and emphasis on a long-range commitment to enabling technologies remain controversial among many space advocates who instead urge national declarations of long-term human occupation specifically of Mars or the Moon.

In addition, the DPT adopted scientific exploration and new discoveries as the primary justification for NASA and modeled the space agency’s mission on the goals that President Thomas Jefferson established for the Lewis and Clark Expedition almost exactly two centuries earlier. As such, the DPT remains the space agency’s most ambitious strategic planning effort to combine explicitly NASA’s science programs with human spaceflight. This philosophy has remained controversial with both scientists and human spaceflight advocates.

== NASA exploration team ==
In early 2001, DPT expanded and became the NASA Exploration Team (NExT), which also reported directly to the agency’s most senior leadership and was led by Mr. Gary Martin. NExT had the additional responsibility to turn concepts and recommendations into specific mission designs, management plans, and priority technology investment strategies. Martin's appointment as Space Architect was announced in a NASA press release on October 11, 2002.

The two teams were kept internal to the space agency and were almost unknown within NASA and by the media. This avoided likely and distracting influences from multiple external interest groups: aerospace industry, Congress, the “space press,” and academia. As such, neither DPT nor NExT were widely known, although their work presaged and significantly influenced the processes that led to President George W. Bush’s 2004 Vision for Space Exploration (VSE). The pioneering work of the DPT and NExT became more widely known when Goldin was succeeded as NASA Administrator by Sean O'Keefe in 2002. The position of Space Architect Office was then established to even further expand the work of the DPT and NExT, moving it into the mainstream of NASA programs. Mr. Martin became the first Space Architect, although the position was abolished by incoming NASA Administrator Dr. Michael D. Griffin.

Although not widely known at the time, the Decadal Planning Team, the NASA Exploration Team, and the Space Architect's office prepared NASA leadership to coordinate its participation in developing the VSE during late 2003.
