= National Launch System =

Proposed family of US super heavy-lift launch vehicles

Proposed NLS family of launch vehicles.

The National Launch System (or New Launch System) was a study authorized in 1991 by President George H. W. Bush to outline alternatives to the Space Shuttle for access to Earth orbit. Shortly thereafter, NASA asked Lockheed Missiles and Space, McDonnell Douglas, and TRW to perform a ten-month study.

A series of launch vehicles was proposed, based around the proposed Space Transportation Main Engine (STME) liquid-fuel rocket engine. The STME was to be a simplified, expendable version of the Space Shuttle main engine (SSME). The NLS-1 was the largest of three proposed vehicles and would have used a modified Space Shuttle external tank for its core stage. The tank would have fed liquid oxygen and liquid hydrogen to four STMEs attached to the bottom of the tank. A payload or second stage would have fit atop the core stage, and two detachable Space Shuttle Solid Rocket Boosters would have been mounted on the sides of the core stage as on the Shuttle. Period illustrations suggest that much larger rockets than NLS-1 were contemplated, using multiples of the NLS-1 core stage.

== Program cancellation ==
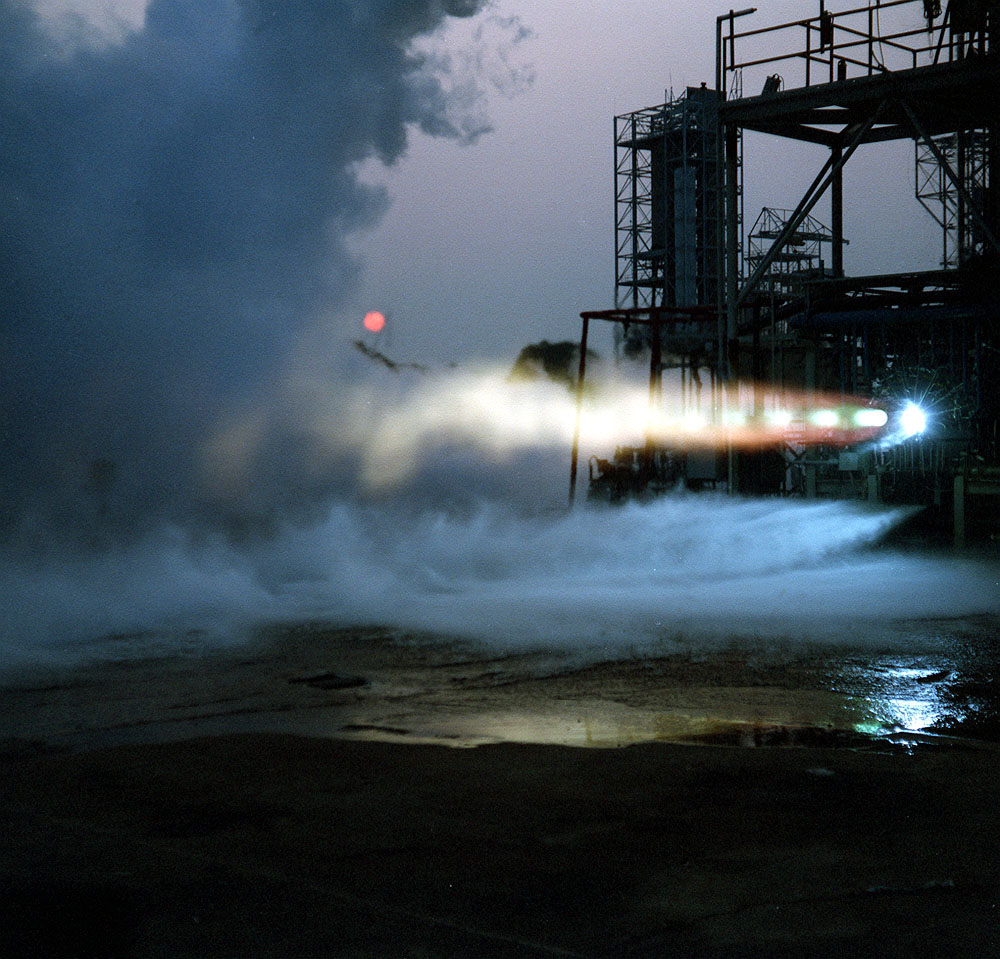
A National Launch System engine being test-fired at NASA's Stennis Space Center

The NLS program did not venture beyond the planning stages and did not survive the Presidency of Bill Clinton, which started in January 1993. In 1992, Daniel Goldin was selected to replace Vice Admiral Richard H. Truly as NASA administrator. Goldin championed the motto, "faster, better, cheaper," which may not have fit the ambitious NLS vision. A NASA history from 1998 says that reusable single-stage-to-orbit (SSTO) rockets and space planes such as the McDonnell Douglas DC-X and the Lockheed Martin X-33 seemed attainable and represented smaller, simpler alternatives to the sprawling Shuttle program. The NLS, by contrast, was more of a continuation of the Shuttle legacy. By the beginning of the Clinton administration, the expensive Space Shuttle and planned Space Station Freedom programs had enough momentum to continue, and the SSTO projects showed enough promise to fund. There was no money left for another big program such as the NLS.

== Legacy ==
In 1994, the United States Air Force Evolved Expendable Launch Vehicle (EELV) program led to the development of the Delta IV. Rocketdyne realized that they would need a powerful, simple engine for the proposed liquid-fueled Common Booster Core (CBC). NLS research on the STME, a simpler SSME, served as a starting point for the greatly simplified RS-68 that powered the Delta IV EELV rocket. The Delta IV Heavy rocket is composed of three CBCs.

NASA later developed a very similar launch vehicle to NLS-1 called the Space Launch System, as part of its Artemis program to return astronauts to the Moon in the mid-2020s. The similarities include a lengthened Shuttle external tank-like core stage, four engines meant as expendable versions of the SSME, and large solid rocket boosters (with five segments instead of four).

== See also ==
- Space Launch System (since 2010)
- Review of United States Human Space Flight Plans Committee (2009)
- First Lunar Outpost
- DIRECT (since 2006)
- Exploration Systems Architecture Study (2005)
- Vision for Space Exploration (since 2004)
- Space Launch Initiative (ca. 2002 - 2004)
- Space policy of the United States (1996)
- Advanced Transportation System Studies (1992–1994)
- Rockwell X-30 (ca. 1990 - 1993)
- Advisory Committee on the Future of the United States Space Program (1990)
- Space Exploration Initiative (1989)
- Advanced Launch System (1987–1990)
- List of space launch system designs
- Studied Space Shuttle Variations and Derivatives
