= Super heavy-lift launch vehicle =

Rocket able to lift 50,000 kg to low Earth orbit

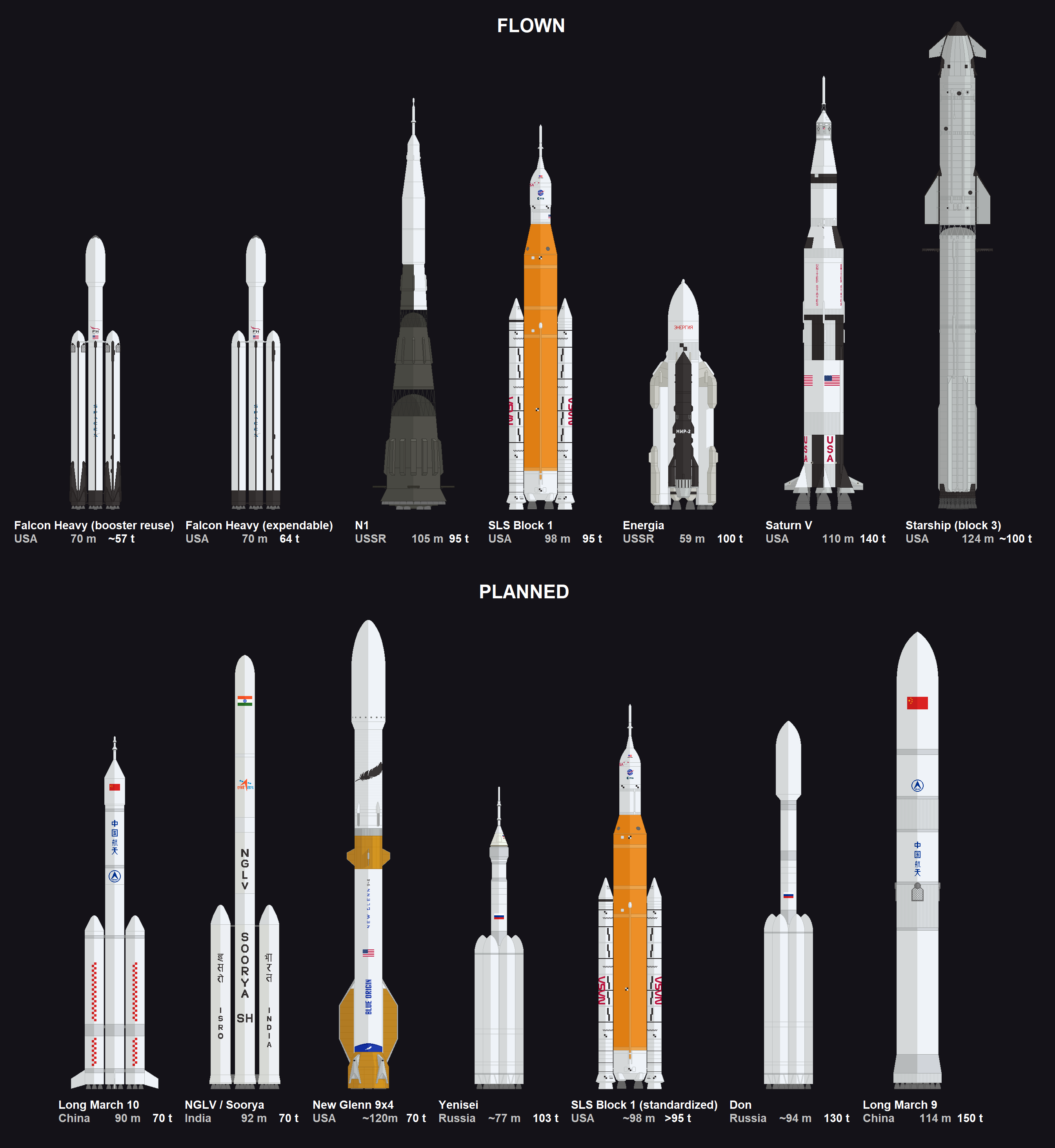
- Super heavy-lift launch vehicles, to scale

Class overview
- Name: Super heavy-lift launch vehicle
- Preceded by: Heavy-lift launch vehicle
- Built: Since 1967

General characteristics
- Capacity: US definition: >50,000 kg (110,000 lb); Russian definition: >100,000 kg (220,000 lb)

A super heavy-lift launch vehicle (SHLLV) is a rocket that can lift a payload of 50 metric tons (110,000 lb) to low Earth orbit according to the United States, and more than 100 metric tons (220,000 lb) by Russia. It is the most capable launch vehicle classification by mass to orbit, exceeding that of the heavy-lift launch vehicle classification. Crewed lunar and interplanetary missions typically depend on super-heavy launch vehicles.

Only 14 such payloads were successfully launched before 2022: 12 as part of the Apollo program before 1972 and two Energia launches, in 1987 and 1988.

Several super heavy-lift launch vehicle concepts were produced in the 1960s, including the Sea Dragon. During the Space Race, the Saturn V and N1 were built by the United States and Soviet Union, respectively. After the Saturn V's successful Apollo program and the N1's failures, the Soviets' Energia launched twice in the 1980s, once bearing the Buran spaceplane. The next two decades saw multiple concepts drawn out once again, most notably Space Shuttle-derived vehicles and Rus-M, but none were built.

In the 21st century, super heavy-lift launch vehicles began to receive interest once again, leading to the development and launch of the Falcon Heavy, the Space Launch System and Starship, as well as the development of the Long March 9 and 10, Yenisei, NGLV, and New Glenn 9x4 rockets.

== Flown vehicles ==
=== Retired ===
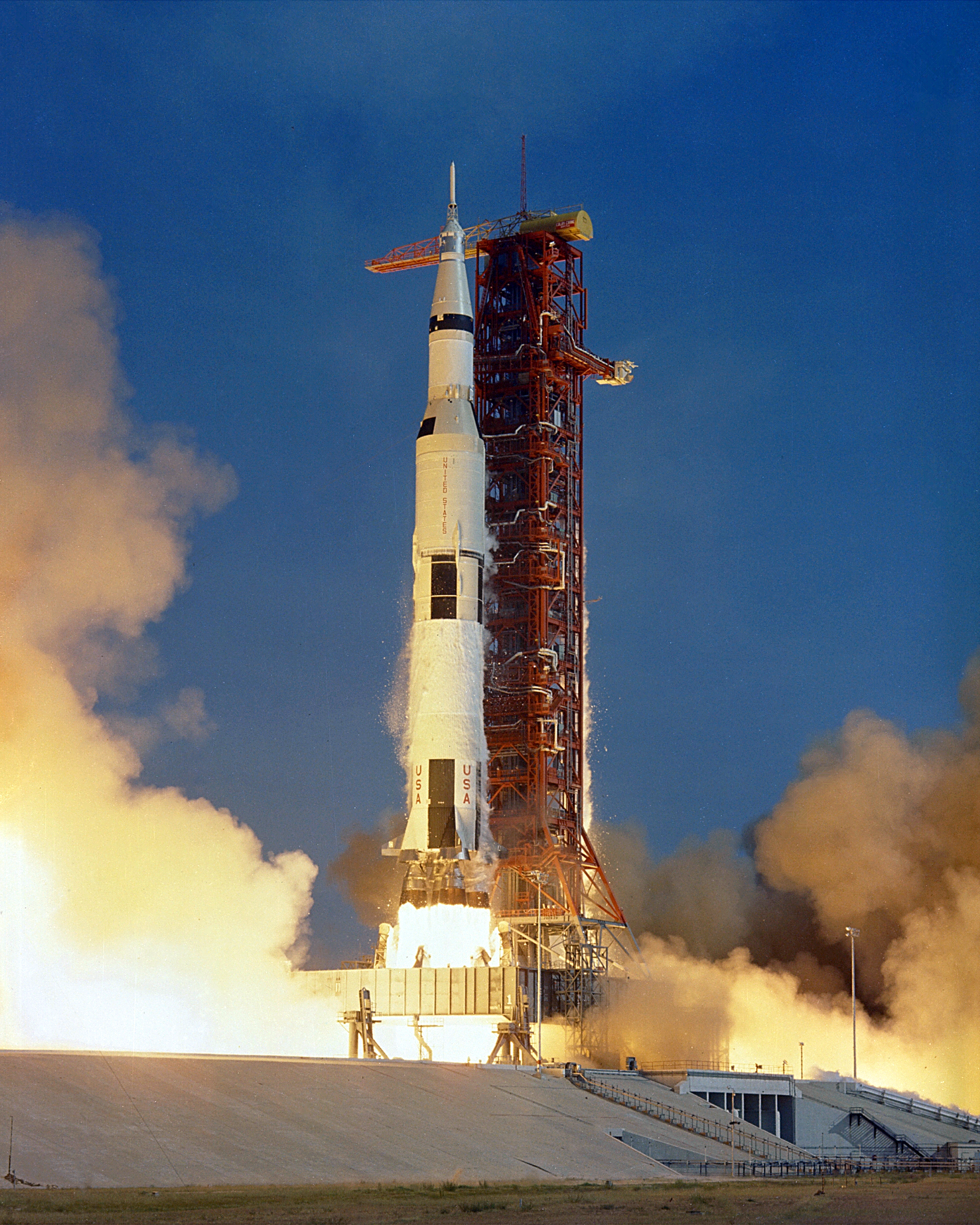
Saturn V launching Apollo 11 in 1969

- Saturn V was a NASA launch vehicle that made 13 orbital launches between 1967 and 1973, principally for the Apollo program through 1972. The Apollo lunar payload included a command module, service module, and Lunar Module, with a total mass of 45 t (99,000 lb). When the third stage and Earth-orbit departure fuel was included, Saturn V placed approximately 140 t (310,000 lb) into low Earth orbit (LEO). The final launch of Saturn V in 1973 placed Skylab, a 77-tonne (170,000 lb) payload, into LEO.
- The Energia launcher was designed by the Soviet Union to launch up to 105 t (231,000 lb) to low Earth orbit. Energia launched twice in 1987/88 before the program was cancelled by the Russian government, which succeeded the Soviet Union, but only the second flight payload reached orbit. On the first flight, launching the Polyus weapons platform (approximately 80 t (180,000 lb)), the vehicle failed to enter orbit due to a software error on the kick-stage. The second flight successfully launched the Buran orbiter. Buran was intended to be reusable, similar to the Space Shuttle Orbiter, but it relied entirely on the disposable launcher Energia to reach orbit.

=== Operational ===
- Falcon Heavy is rated to launch 63.8 t (141,000 lb) to low Earth orbit (LEO) in a fully expendable configuration and an estimated 57 t (126,000 lb) in a partially reusable configuration, in which two of its three boosters are recovered. (Note: A configuration in which all three cores are intended to be recoverable is classified as a heavy-lift launch vehicle since its maximum possible payload to LEO is under 50,000 kg.) The latter configuration flew on 1 November 2022, but with a much smaller ~3,700 kg (8,200 lb) payload being launched to geostationary orbit with a maximum ~9,200 kg (20,300 lb) payload being launched to geostationary orbit on 29 July 2023 on the rocket's seventh overall flight. The fully expendable configuration first flew on 1 May 2023, but with a smaller ~6,722 kg (14,819 lb) payload being launched to geostationary orbit. The first test flight occurred on 6 February 2018, in a configuration in which recovery of all three boosters was attempted, with Elon Musk's Tesla Roadster of 1,250 kg (2,760 lb) sent to an orbit beyond Mars.
- The Space Launch System (SLS) is a US government super heavy-lift expendable launch vehicle developed by NASA that can carry 95 t (209,000 lb) to low Earth orbit. It launched its first mission on 16 November 2022 and is slated to be the primary launch vehicle for NASA's deep space exploration plans, including the planned crewed lunar flights of the Artemis program and a possible follow-on human mission to Mars in the 2030s.
- Starship is a two-stage-to-orbit fully reusable launch vehicle being privately developed by SpaceX, consisting of the Super Heavy booster as the first stage and a second stage, also called Starship. It is designed to be a long-duration cargo and passenger-carrying spacecraft. Starship completed its first successful launch on its third flight on March 14, 2024, and achieved soft landing of both stages on its fourth flight. The first stage booster was successfully caught on its fifth flight, and a booster first stage was reused on its ninth flight. On September 28, 2026, during its fourteenth flight, Starship became operational when it deployed 26 Starlink v3 satellites to LEO (estimated payload mass 52 t). On its fifteenth flight, the second stage was caught for the first time.

=== Under development ===
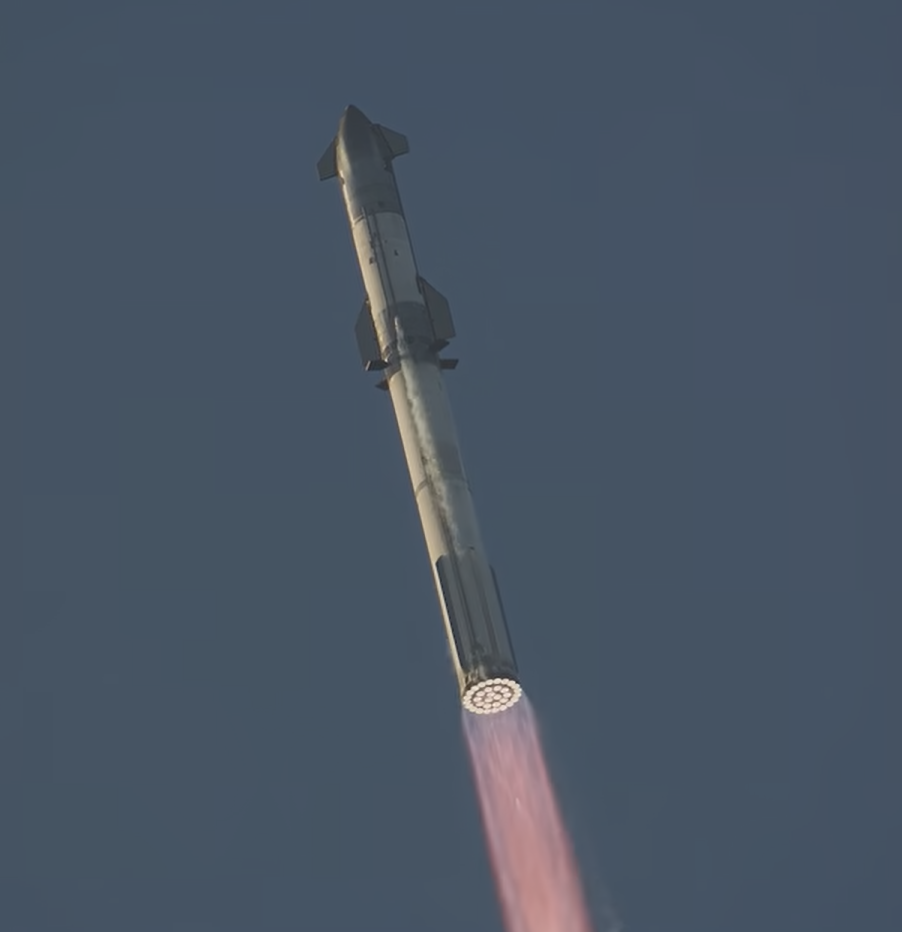
Starship flight test in 2023

- The Long March 9 is a Chinese three-stage-to-orbit partially reusable launch vehicle being developed by the China Academy of Launch Vehicle Technology. The design has undergone numerous major changes over the years and with the most recent designs showing some resemblance to the SpaceX Starship. The Long March 9 is planned to be operational by the early 2030s.
- The Long March 10 is a Chinese three-stage-to-orbit partially reusable launch vehicle being developed by the China Academy of Launch Vehicle Technology with an initial launch targeting 2027.
- New Glenn 9x4 is a partially reusable two-stage-to-orbit launch vehicle being developed by Blue Origin. The vehicle is derived from the currently flying New Glenn 7x2.

=== Unsuccessfully flown ===
- The N1 was a three-stage super heavy lift launch vehicle developed in the Soviet Union from 1965 to 1974. It was the Soviet counterpart to the Saturn V, however all four test flights of the vehicle ended in flight failure. For lunar missions, it would carry the L3 crewed lunar payload into Low Earth Orbit, which had an additional two stages, a Soyuz 7K-LOK as a mothership and an LK lunar lander that would be used for crewed lunar landings. Its Block A first stage held the record for the most thrust of any rocket stage built until it was superseded by the Super Heavy booster on its first flight.

== Comparison ==
Rocket	Configuration	Organization	Liftoff thrust	Mass to LEO	Maiden successful flight	Heaviest known launch			Status	Reusable	Launches (success / total)	Cost per launch (adjusted for inflation)
Rocket	Configuration	Organization	Liftoff thrust	Mass to LEO	Maiden successful flight	...to LEO or MEO	...to GTO or GSO	...to HEO and beyond	Status	Reusable	Launches (success / total)	Cost per launch (adjusted for inflation)
Saturn V		NASA	34.5 MN (7,750,000 lb_{f})	140 t (310,000 lb) (Note: Includes mass of Apollo command and service modules, Apollo Lunar Module, Spacecraft/LM Adapter, Saturn V Instrument Unit, S-IVB stage, and propellant for translunar injection; payload mass to LEO is about 122.4 t (270,000 lb).)	1967	76,540 kg (168,740 lb)	—N/a	45,200 kg (99,600 lb)	Retired (1973)	No	12 (Note: Apollo 6 was a "partial failure": It reached orbit, but had problems with the second and third stages.) / 13	US$1.53 billion (in 2025)
N1		OKB-1	45.3 MN (10,200,000 lb_{f})	95 t (209,000 lb)	None	—N/a	—N/a	—N/a	Cancelled (1974)	No	0 / 4	US$1.81 billion (in 2025)
Energia		NPO Energia	35.8 MN (8,000,000 lb_{f})	105 t (231,000 lb) (Note: Required upper stage or payload to perform final orbital insertion.)	1987	80,000 kg (180,000 lb)	—N/a	—N/a	Retired (1988)	No	2 / 2	US$2.29 billion (in 2025)
Falcon Heavy	Recovered boosters	SpaceX	22.8 MN (5,100,000 lb_{f})	57 t (126,000 lb)	2022	—N/a	9,200 kg (20,300 lb)	9,174 kg (20,225 lb)	Operational	Partially (Note: Side booster cores recoverable, center core intentionally expended. First reuse of the side boosters was demonstrated in 2019 when the ones used on the Arabsat-6A launch were reused on the STP-2 launch.)	9 / 9 (Note: Falcon Heavy has launched 14 times since 2018, but first three times did not qualify as a "super heavy" because recovery of the center core was attempted.)	US$107 million (in 2025)
Falcon Heavy	Expended	SpaceX	22.8 MN (5,100,000 lb_{f})	63.8 t (141,000 lb)	2023	—N/a	6,722 kg (14,819 lb)	6,065 kg (13,371 lb)	Operational	No	2 / 2	US$197 million (in 2025)
SLS		NASA	39.1 MN (8,800,000 lb_{f})	95 t (209,000 lb) (Note: Includes mass of Orion spacecraft, European Service Module, Interim Cryogenic Propulsion Stage, and propellant for translunar injection.)	2022	—N/a	—N/a	26,520 kg (58,470 lb)	Operational	No	2 / 2	US$2.6 billion (in 2025)
Starship	Block 3	SpaceX	80.8 MN (18,200,000 lb_{f})	100 t (220,000 lb)	2026	~44,000 kg (97,000 lb)	—N/a	—N/a	Operational	Planned (fully)	4 / 4	?
Starship	Block 4	SpaceX	98.1 MN (22,100,000 lb_{f})	200 t (440,000 lb)	TBA	—N/a	—N/a	—N/a	Under development	Planned (fully)	—N/a	?
Long March 9		CALT	60 MN (13,000,000 lb_{f})	150 t (330,000 lb)	Planned (2033)	—N/a	—N/a	—N/a	Under development	Planned (partially)	—N/a	?
Long March 10		CALT	26.25 MN (5,900,000 lb_{f})	70 t (150,000 lb)	Planned (2027)	—N/a	—N/a	—N/a	Under development	No	—N/a	?
New Glenn	9×4	Blue Origin	25.621 MN (5,760,000 lb_{f})	70 t (150,000 lb)	Planned (2027)	—N/a	—N/a	—N/a	Under development	Partially	—N/a	?
NGLV	SH	ISRO	TBA	75 t (165,000 lb)	TBA	—N/a	—N/a	—N/a	Under development	Planned (partially)	—N/a	?
Yenisei	Yenisei	Progress	43.5 MN (9,800,000 lb_{f})	103 t (227,000 lb)	TBA	—N/a	—N/a	—N/a	Under development	No	—N/a	?
Yenisei	Don	Progress	43.5 MN (9,800,000 lb_{f})	130 t (290,000 lb)	TBA	—N/a	—N/a	—N/a	Under development	No	—N/a	?

== Proposed designs ==
=== Chinese proposals ===
Long March 10 was first proposed in 2018 as a concept for the Chinese Lunar Exploration Program. Long March 9, an over 150 t (330,000 lb) to LEO capable rocket was proposed in 2018 by China, with plans to launch the rocket by 2028. The length of the Long March-9 will exceed 114 meters, and the rocket would have a core stage with a diameter of 10 meters. Long March 9 is expected to carry a payload of over 50 tonnes for Earth-Moon transfer orbit. Development was approved in 2021.

=== Russian proposals ===
Yenisei, a super heavy-lift launch vehicle using existing components instead of pushing the less-powerful Angara A5V project, was proposed by Russia's RSC Energia in August 2016.

A revival of the Energia booster was proposed in 2016, also to avoid pushing the Angara project. If developed, this vehicle could allow Russia to launch missions towards establishing a permanent Moon base with simpler logistics, launching one or two 80-to-160-tonne super-heavy rockets instead of four 40-tonne Angara A5Vs implying quick-sequence launches and multiple in-orbit rendezvous. In February 2018, the КРК СТК (space rocket complex of the super-heavy class) design was updated to lift at least 90 tonnes to LEO and 20 tonnes to lunar polar orbit, and to be launched from Vostochny Cosmodrome. The first flight is scheduled for 2028, with Moon landings starting in 2030. This proposal may have been at least paused.

=== US proposals ===
Blue Origin has plans for a project following their New Glenn rocket, termed New Armstrong, which some media sources have speculated will be a larger launch vehicle.

== Cancelled designs ==
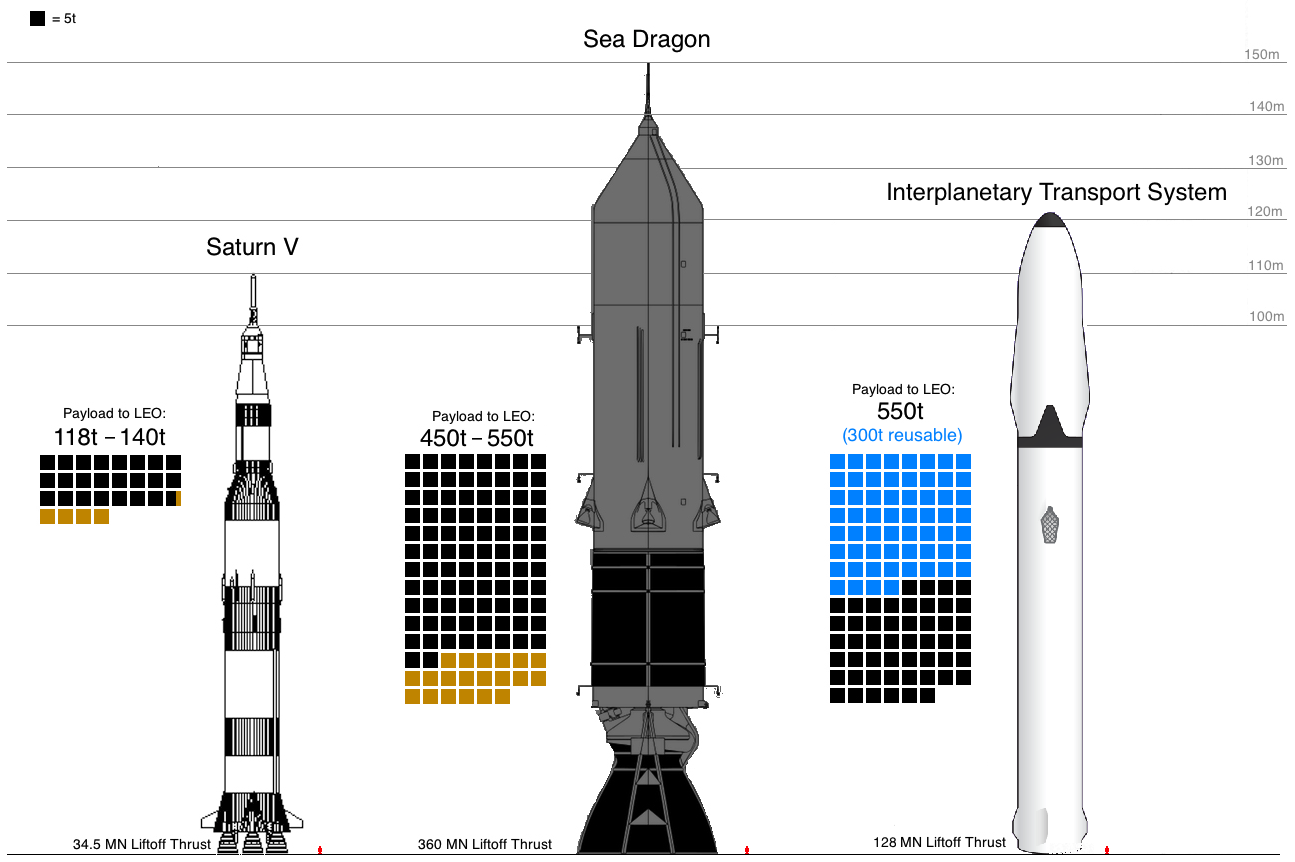
Comparison of Saturn V, Sea Dragon and Interplanetary Transport System

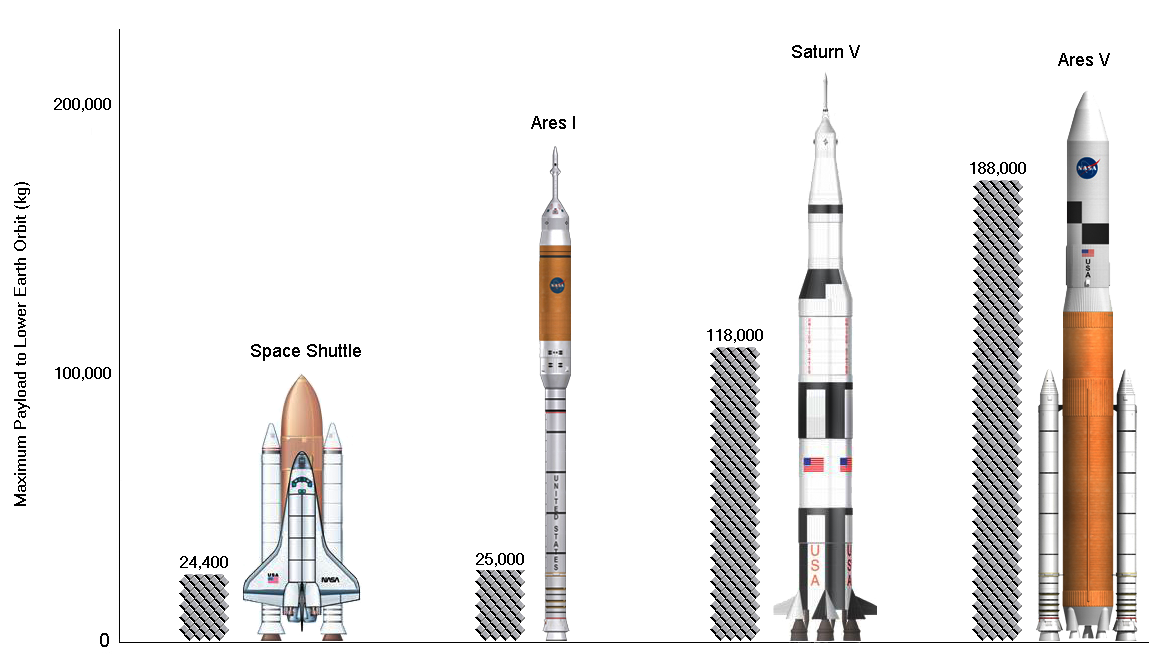
Comparison of Space Shuttle, Ares I, Saturn V and Ares V

Numerous super-heavy-lift vehicles have been proposed and received various levels of development prior to their cancellation.

As part of the Soviet crewed lunar project to compete with Apollo/Saturn V, the N1 rocket was secretly designed with a payload capacity of 95 t (209,000 lb). Four test vehicles were launched from 1969 to 1972, but all failed shortly after lift-off. The program was suspended in May 1974 and formally cancelled in March 1976. The Soviet UR-700 rocket design concept competed against the N1, but was never developed. In the concept, it was to have had a payload capacity of up to 151 t (333,000 lb) to low earth orbit.

During project Aelita (1969–1972), the Soviets were developing a way to beat the Americans to Mars. They designed the UR-700A, a nuclear powered variant of the UR-700, and UR-700M, a LOx/Kerosene variant to assemble the 1,400 t (3,100,000 lb) MK-700 spacecraft in earth orbit in two launches. The UR-700M would have a payload capacity of 750 t (1,650,000 lb). The only Universal Rocket pass the design phase was the UR-500 while the N1 was selected to be the Soviets' HLV for lunar and Martian missions.

The UR-900, proposed in 1969, would have had a payload capacity of 240 t (530,000 lb) to low earth orbit. It never left the drawing board.

The General Dynamics Nexus was proposed in the 1960s as a fully reusable successor to the Saturn V rocket, having the capacity of transporting up to 450–910 t (990,000–2,000,000 lb) to orbit.

The American Saturn MLV family of rockets was proposed in 1965 by NASA as successors to the Saturn V rocket. It would have been able to carry up to 160,880 kg (354,680 lb) to low Earth orbit. The Nova designs were also studied by NASA before the agency chose the Saturn V in the early 1960s Nova was cancelled in 1964 and had reusable variants.

Based on the recommendations of the Stafford Synthesis report, First Lunar Outpost (FLO) would have relied on a massive Saturn-derived launch vehicle known as the Comet HLLV. The Comet would have been capable of injecting 254.4 t into LEO and 97.6 t on a Trans-Lunar Injection (TLI) making it one of the most capable vehicles ever designed. FLO was cancelled during the design process along with the rest of the Space Exploration Initiative.

The U.S. Ares V for the Constellation program was intended to reuse many elements of the Space Shuttle program, both on the ground and flight hardware, to save costs. The Ares V was designed to carry 188 t (414,000 lb) and was cancelled in 2010.

The Shuttle-Derived Heavy Lift Launch Vehicle ("HLV") was an alternate super heavy-lift launch vehicle proposal for the NASA Constellation program, proposed in 2009.

A 1962 design proposal, Sea Dragon, called for an enormous 150 m (490 ft) tall, sea-launched rocket capable of lifting 550 t (1,210,000 lb) to low Earth orbit. Although preliminary engineering of the design was done by TRW, the project never moved forward due to the closing of NASA's Future Projects Branch.

The Rus-M was a proposed Russian family of launchers whose development began in 2009. It would have had two super heavy variants: one able to lift 50–60 tons, and another able to lift 130–150 tons.

SpaceX Interplanetary Transport System was a 12 m (39 ft) diameter launch vehicle concept unveiled in 2016. The payload capability was to be 550 t (1,210,000 lb) in an expendable configuration or 300 t (660,000 lb) in a reusable configuration. In 2017, the design evolved into a 9 m (30 ft) diameter concept Big Falcon Rocket, which became the SpaceX Starship.

== See also ==
- Comparison of orbital launch systems
- List of orbital launch systems
- Sounding rocket, suborbital launch vehicle
- Small-lift launch vehicle, capable of lifting up to 2,000 kg (4,400 lb) to low Earth orbit
- Medium-lift launch vehicle, capable of lifting 2,000 to 20,000 kg (4,400 to 44,000 lb) of payload into low Earth orbit
- Heavy-lift launch vehicle, capable of lifting 20,000 to 50,000 kg (44,000 to 110,000 lb) of payload into low Earth orbit
