= Space Exploration Initiative =

1989-1993 program outlining NASA's long-term vision for crewed interplanetary missions

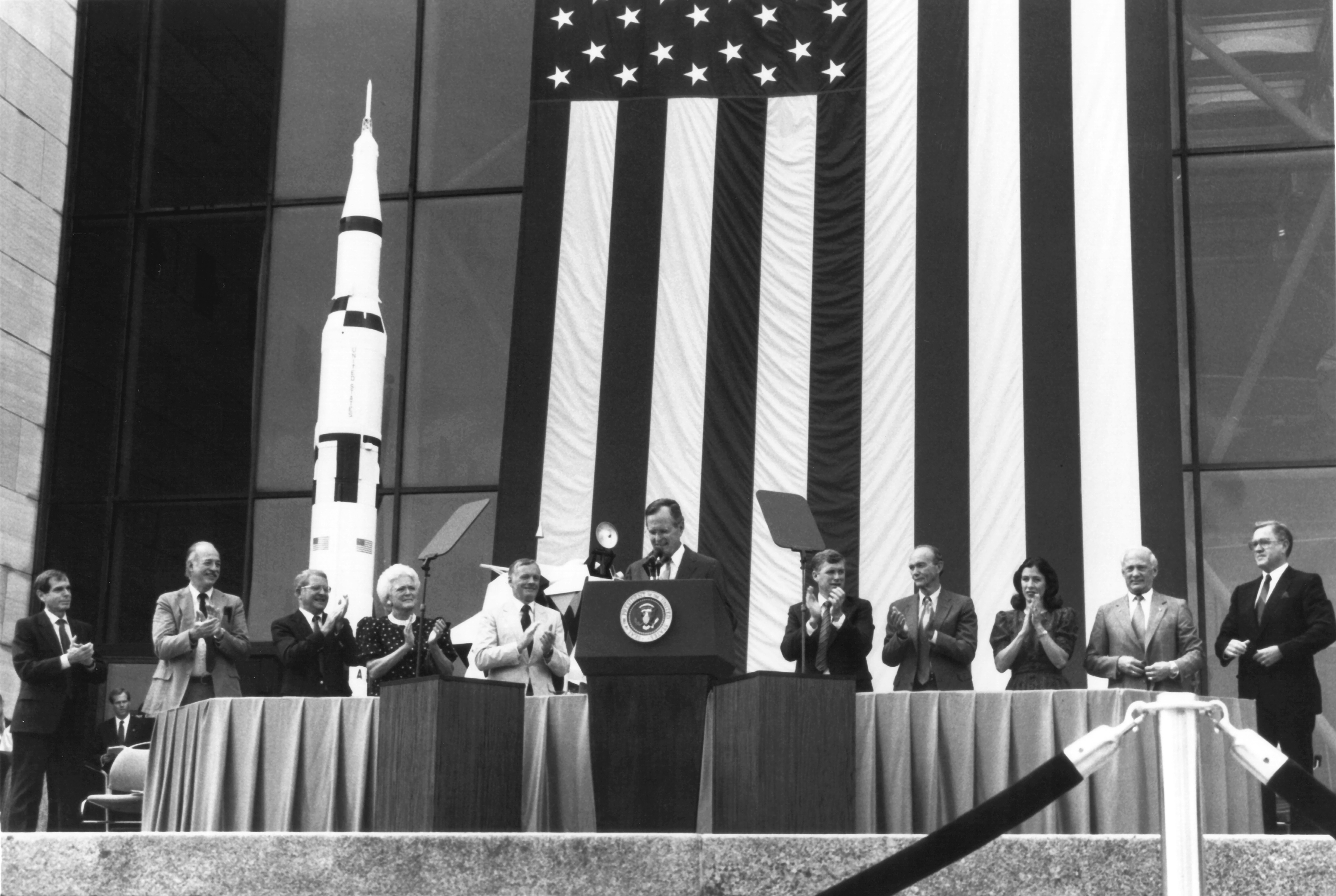
President George H. W. Bush announcing the Space Exploration Initiative at the National Air and Space Museum's 20th anniversary celebration of the Apollo 11 Moon landing

The Space Exploration Initiative was a 1989–1993 space public policy initiative of the George H. W. Bush administration.

On July 20, 1989, the 20th anniversary of the Apollo 11 Moon landing, US president George H. W. Bush announced plans for what came to be known as the Space Exploration Initiative (SEI). In a speech on the steps of the National Air and Space Museum he described plans calling for constructing Space Station Freedom, sending humans back to the Moon "to stay" and ultimately sending astronauts to explore Mars. He proposed not a 10-year Apollo-style plan, but a long-range continuing commitment based on the three above elements, ending with "a journey into tomorrow – a journey to another planet – a manned mission to Mars." The President noted it was humanity's destiny to explore, and America's destiny to lead. He asked Vice President Dan Quayle to lead the National Space Council in determining what was needed to carry out these missions in terms of money, manpower and technology.

In the event, execution of the initiative was assigned to NASA, but the initiative did not survive long into the administration of the next president, Bill Clinton.

== Background ==
In August 1987 a committee chaired by former astronaut Dr. Sally Ride released a report entitled Leadership and America's Future in Space. The "Ride Report" advocated establishment of a permanent Moon base by 2010 and landing a crew on Mars early in the 21st century.

On January 5, 1988 President Ronald Reagan approved a revised United States national space policy, which was classified. On February 11 a summary "Fact Sheet" about the policy was publicly released. The policy identified six goals of United States space activities, the last of which was, "to expand human presence and activity beyond Earth orbit into the solar system."

In the view of NASA, the July 20, 1989 speech by President Bush, "provided specificity" to that policy goal. Following this announcement NASA Administrator Richard Truly initiated a study of the options to achieve the President's goals, headed by Johnson Space Center Director Aaron Cohen. A report on that study, called, "the 90-Day Study on Human Exploration of the Moon and Mars" (or simply, "the 90-Day Study"), was published by NASA on November 20, 1989.

== Development ==
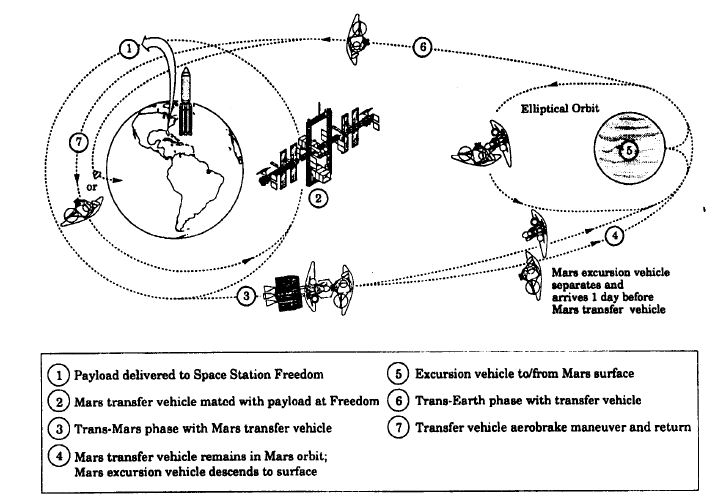
Mars mission design

The 90-Day Study estimated SEI's long-term cost at approximately 500 billion dollars spread over 20 to 30 years. According to Steve Dick, NASA Chief Historian, the National Academy of Sciences largely concurred with the NASA study, but White House and Congressional reaction to the NASA plan was hostile, primarily due to the cost estimate. In particular, Democratic members of Congress had almost immediate criticism over Bush's plan. Chairman of the Budget Committee, Senator Jim Sasser, stated "The President took one giant leap for starry-eyed political rhetoric, and not even a small step for fiscal responsibility. The hard fact is, this Administration doesn't even have its space priorities established for next year, much less for the next century." His fellow Tennessee Senator Al Gore also was quoted expressing his criticism of Bush's plan, saying "By proposing a return to the Moon, with no money, no timetable, and no plan, President Bush offers the country not a challenge to inspire us, but a daydream to briefly entertain us, a daydream about as splashy as a George Lucas movie, with about as much connection to reality." President Bush sought international partners, but the program was thought too expensive even for an international endeavor.

In August 1990, Vice President Quayle established an advisory committee, often called the "Augustine Commission", which recommended that NASA should focus on space and Earth science, and transition human exploration to a "go-as-you-pay" strategy.

== Ending ==
On April 1, 1992 Dan Goldin became NASA Administrator, and during his tenure near-term human exploration beyond Earth orbit was abandoned, and the "faster, better, cheaper" strategy was applied to space science robotic exploration.

When the White House National Science and Technology Council released their revision of the National Space Policy in September 1996, it specifically lacked any mention of human space exploration beyond Earth's orbit. The next day, President Clinton stated on a campaigning trip through the Pacific Northwest that a human mission to Mars was too expensive and instead affirmed America's commitment to a series of less expensive probes, thus removing human exploration from the national agenda.

== Projects ==
=== Space Station ===
Construction of Space Station Freedom.

=== Lunar Orbiter Missions ===
The Lunar Orbiter Missions would yield further information on the distribution of high-TiO regolith on the whole Moon, through gamma-ray spectroscopy. The purpose was stated to be to provide a detailed geochemical and mineralogical map of the Moon. Global stereo imaging to aid in site selection was also given as a function of the mission.

=== Common Lunar Lander program (CLL) ===
The CLL program would have consisted of a series of Apollo-type missions, mostly robotic. One mission was entitled Outpost Site Survey and Resource Assessment, involving the use of rovers. The site selected was in Mare Tranquillitatis near 15° N 22° E. This point is on the boundary between mare material and the ejecta blanket of the huge (45 km diameter) crater Plinius, on the east margin of a 25–40 km-wide band of material separating the ejecta blanket from highlands to the west.

=== First Lunar Outpost program (FLO) ===
The First Lunar Outpost (FLO) was the most comprehensive Moon base study under the Space Exploration Initiative (SEI). It was intended to be the flagship of the program from which other proposals such as ILREC would have to compete against. The FLO concept incorporated many recommendations from the 1991 Stafford Synthesis report, mainly the use of a Nova class super heavy launch vehicle to minimize assembly and operations in LEO and on the surface of the Moon. FLO was a major change from previous SEI proposals as the vehicle was standalone and expendable rather than reusable and being staged off of Space Station Freedom. The design was based on massive yet simple launchers to carry massive amounts of payloads at once rather than many small and complicated launches. This was to reduce cost and development time. The program would have almost completely consisted of existing technology such as the Saturn and Space Station with only the landing vehicle needing to be developed.

=== International Lunar Resource Exploration Concept ===
The International Lunar Resources Exploration Concept was a proposed mission architecture by Kent Joosten, an engineer at Johnson Space Center. The plan would have used the help of international partners, mainly Soviet Union, to assemble a lunar base and sustainable lunar transportation service. The plan would be a lunar surface rendezvous (LSR), where two vehicles would meet on the surface for refueling, rather than Apollo's Lunar orbit rendezvous (LOR). NASA's Jet Propulsion Laboratory proposed a LSR for Apollo but it was quickly turned down due to the amount of technology, such as In situ resource utilization, that would need to be developed.

== See also ==
- National Launch System
- Space Shuttle
- Mir
- HL-20
- Vision for space exploration

== Videos ==
- Video Space Exploration Initiative (Nasa) 4 min
- 1989 Space Exploration Initiative announce, 35 min
