= Space Station Freedom =

Proposed U.S. space station

Freedom
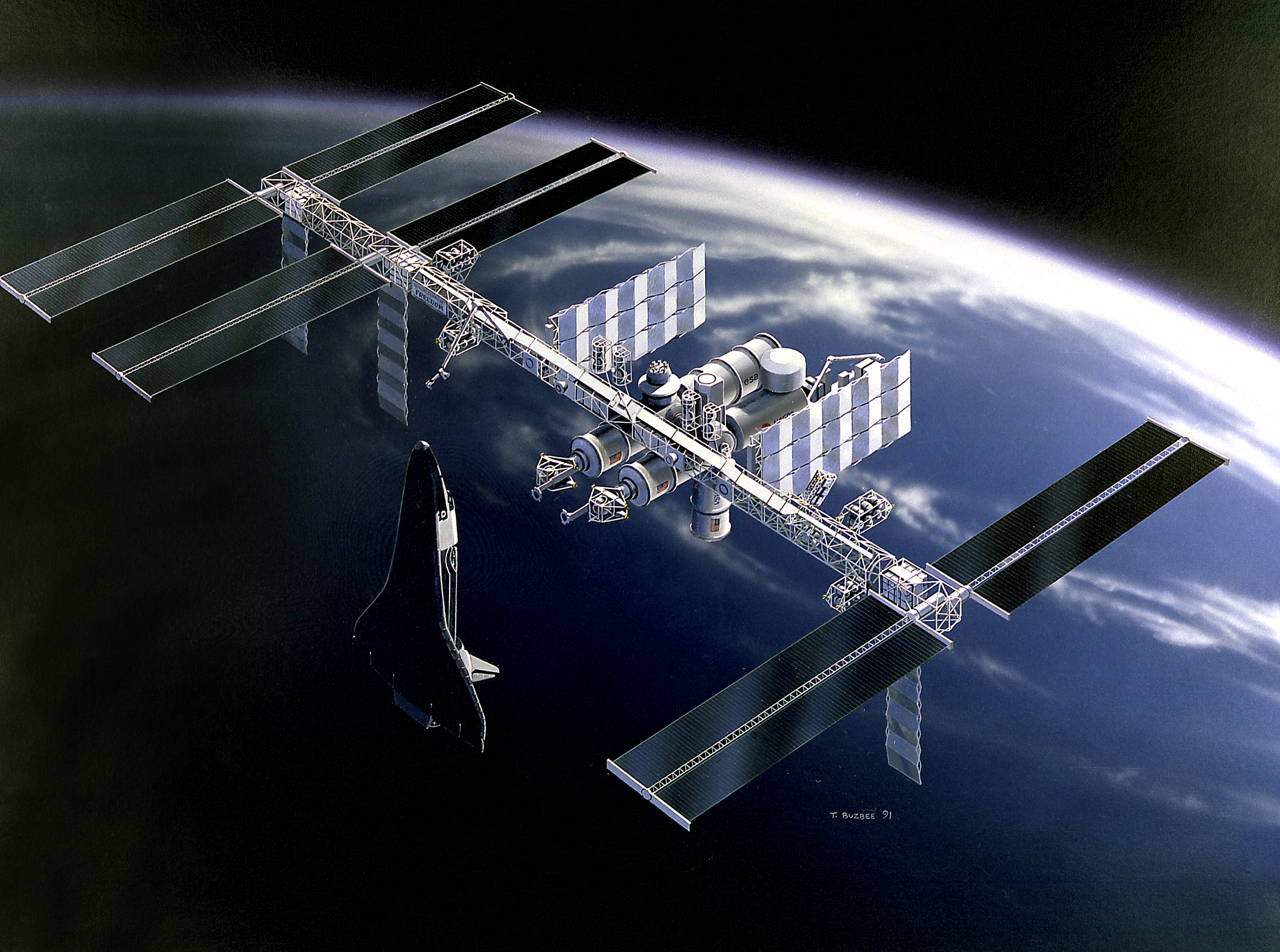
- Artist's rendition by Tom Buzbee of the proposed Space Station Freedom design as of early 1991. An annotated version of this image is also available.

Station statistics
- Crew: 4
- Mission status: Project converted into International Space Station
- Pressurized volume: 878 m^{3} (31,000 cu ft)
- Periapsis altitude: 400 km (250 mi)
- Apoapsis altitude: 400 km (250 mi)
- Orbital inclination: 28.5 deg

Space Station Freedom was a NASA-led multi-national project proposed in the 1980s to construct a permanently crewed space station in low Earth orbit. Despite initial approval by President Ronald Reagan and a public announcement in the 1984 State of the Union Address, the ambitious project faced significant budget cuts and delays. Ultimately, a scaled-down version of Freedom evolved into the US Orbital Segment (USOS) of the International Space Station (ISS).

By the time the project was canceled, NASA had already invested approximately $11 billion into Space Station Freedom, however some of that work would benefit the ISS. As originally envisioned, the station would have been a collaborative project involving four participating space agencies: NASA (United States), NASDA (Japan), ESA (Europe), and CSA (Canada). Those same partners would go on to build the USOS, but the ISS program also included Roscosmos of Russia who contributed their significant experience building and operating space stations during Mir and the Salyut program to construct the Russian Orbital Segment.

== Original proposal ==
As the Apollo program began to wind down in the late 1960s, there were numerous proposals for what should follow it. Of the many proposals, large and small, three major themes emerged. Foremost among them was a crewed mission to Mars, using systems not unlike the ones used for Apollo. A permanent space station was also a major goal, both to help construct the large spacecraft needed for a Mars mission as well as to learn about long-term operations in space. Finally, a space logistics vehicle was intended to cheaply launch crews and cargo to that station.

In the early 1970s, Spiro Agnew took these general plans to President Richard Nixon, who was battling with a major federal budget deficit. When he presented the three concepts, Nixon told him to select one. After much debate, NASA selected the space logistics vehicle, which by this time was already known as the Space Shuttle. They argued that the Shuttle would lower costs of launching cargo so it would make the construction of the station less expensive.

From this point forward these plans were never seriously changed, in spite of dramatic changes to the funding environment and the complete redesign of the Shuttle concept. In the early 1980s, with the Space Shuttle completed, NASA proposed the creation of a large, permanently crewed space station, which then-NASA Administrator James M. Beggs called "the next logical step" in space. In some ways it was meant to be the U.S. answer to the Soviet Mir.

NASA plans called for the station, which was later dubbed Space Station Freedom, to function as an orbiting repair shop for satellites, an assembly point for spacecraft, an observation post for astronomers, a microgravity laboratory for scientists, and a microgravity factory for companies.

Reagan announced plans to build Space Station Freedom in 1984, stating: "We can follow our dreams to distant stars, living and working in space for peaceful economic and scientific gain."

== Design iterations ==
Following the presidential announcement, NASA began a set of studies to determine the potential uses for the space station, both in research and in industry, in the U.S. or overseas. This led to the creation of a database of thousands of possible missions and payloads; studies were also carried out with a view to supporting potential planetary missions, as well as those in low Earth orbit.

Several Space Shuttle missions in the 1980s and early 1990s included spacewalks to demonstrate and test space station construction techniques. After the establishment of the initial baseline design, the project evolved extensively, growing in scope and cost.

=== "Power Tower" (1984) ===
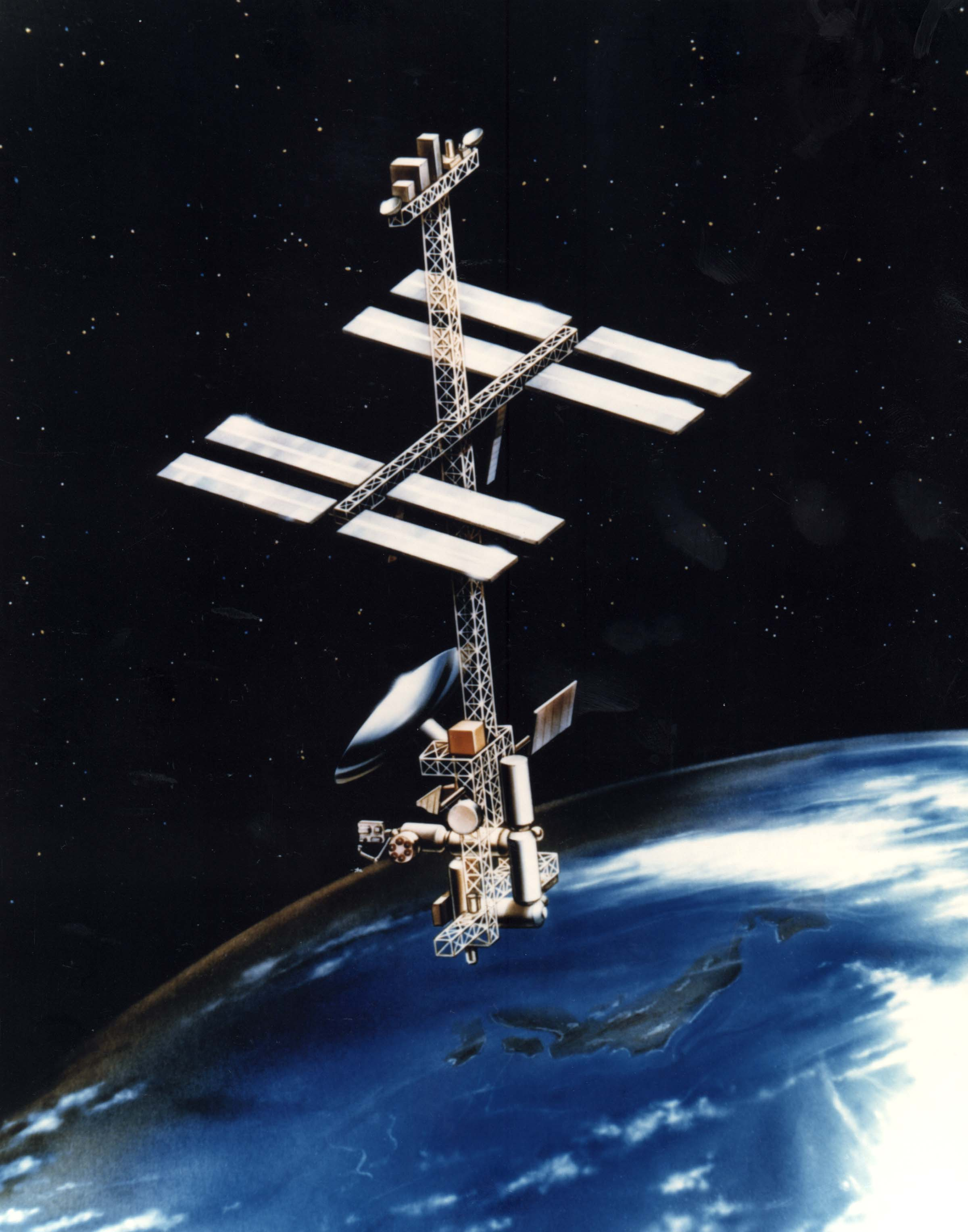
Artistic rendering of "Power Tower" space station concept (1984)

In April 1984, the newly established Space Station Program Office at Johnson Space Center produced a first reference configuration; this design would serve as a baseline for further planning. The chosen design was the "Power Tower", a long central keel with most mass located at either end. This arrangement would provide enough gravity gradient stability to keep the station aligned with the keel pointed towards the Earth, reducing the need for thruster firings. Most designs featured a cluster of modules at the lower end and a set of articulated solar arrays at the upper end. It also contained a servicing bay. In April 1985, the program selected a set of contractors to carry out definition studies and preliminary design; various trade-offs were made in this process, balancing higher development costs against reduced long-term operating costs.

=== Revised Baseline Configuration (1987) ===
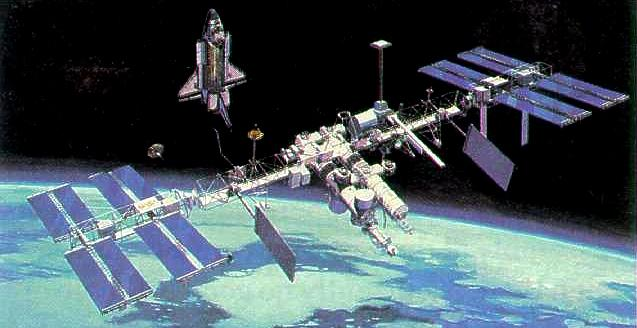
Artistic rendering of Revised Baseline Configuration (1987)

At the same time, late 1986, NASA carried out a study into new configuration options to reduce development costs; options studied ranged from the use of a Skylab-type station to a phased development of the Dual-Keel configuration. This approach involved splitting assembly into two phases; Phase 1 would provide the central modules, and the transverse boom, but with no keels. The solar arrays would be augmented to ensure 75 kW of power would be provided, and the polar platform and servicing facility were again deferred. The study concluded that the project was viable, reducing development costs while minimizing negative impacts, and it was designated the Revised Baseline Configuration. This would have a development cost of US$15.3 billion (in FY1989 dollars) and FEL in the first quarter of 1994. This replanning was endorsed by the National Research Council in September 1987, which also recommended that the long-term national goals should be studied before committing to any particular Phase 2 design.

During 1986 and 1987, various other studies were carried out on the future of the U.S. space program; the results of these often impacted the Space Station, and their recommendations were folded into the revised baseline as necessary. One of the results of these was to baseline the Station program as requiring five shuttle flights a year for operations and logistics, rotating four crew at a time with the aim of extending individual stay times to 180 days.

=== Freedom (1988) to Alpha (1993) ===
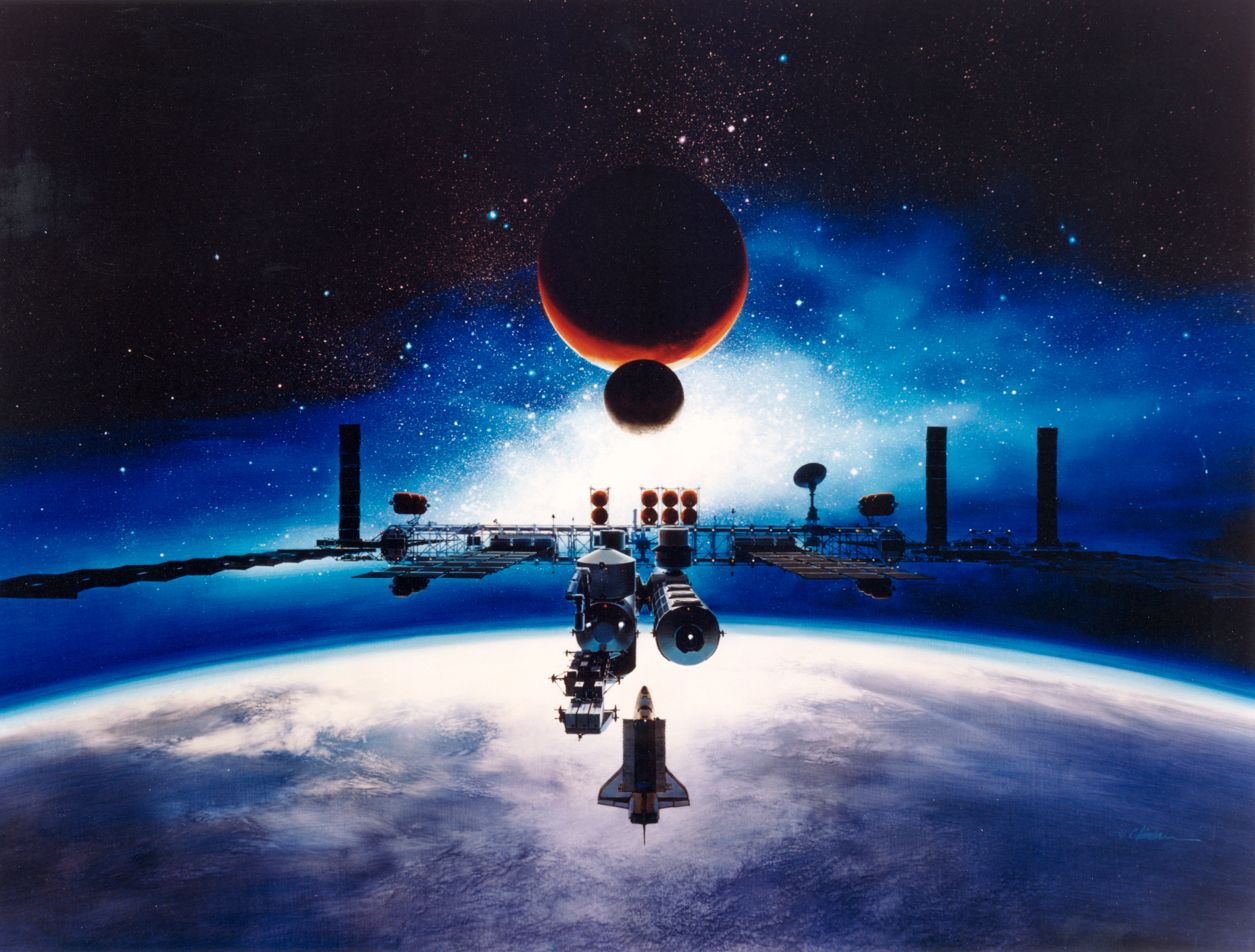
Artist's conception of the completed Space Station Freedom in orbit (1991)

NASA signed final ten-year contracts for developing the Space Station in September 1988, and the project was finally moving into the hardware fabrication phase. The station was designed with a thirty year life in mind.

The Space Station Freedom design was slightly modified in late 1989 after the program's Fiscal 1990 budget again was reduced — from $2.05 billion to $1.75 billion — when the design was found to be 23% overweight and over budget, too complicated to assemble, and providing little power for its users. The 1990 Space Exploration Initiative called for the construction of the Space Station Freedom. Congress consequently demanded yet another redesign in October 1990, and requested further cost reductions after the fiscal 1991 budget was cut from $2.5 billion to $1.9 billion. NASA unveiled its new space station design in March 1991.

Repeated budget cuts had forced a postponement of the first launch by a year, to March 1995. The station would be permanently crewed from June 1997 onwards, and completed in February 1998.

In 1993, after more calls for the station to be redesigned again to reduce costs and include more international involvement, the option that became known as Space Station 'Alpha' was chosen (from three competing concepts), using 75 percent of the hardware designs originally intended for the Freedom program. Cost escalation of the project and financial difficulties in Russia led to a briefing between NASA and NPO Energia on Mir-2 that same year, resulting in an option known briefly as the Russian Alpha (RAlpha).

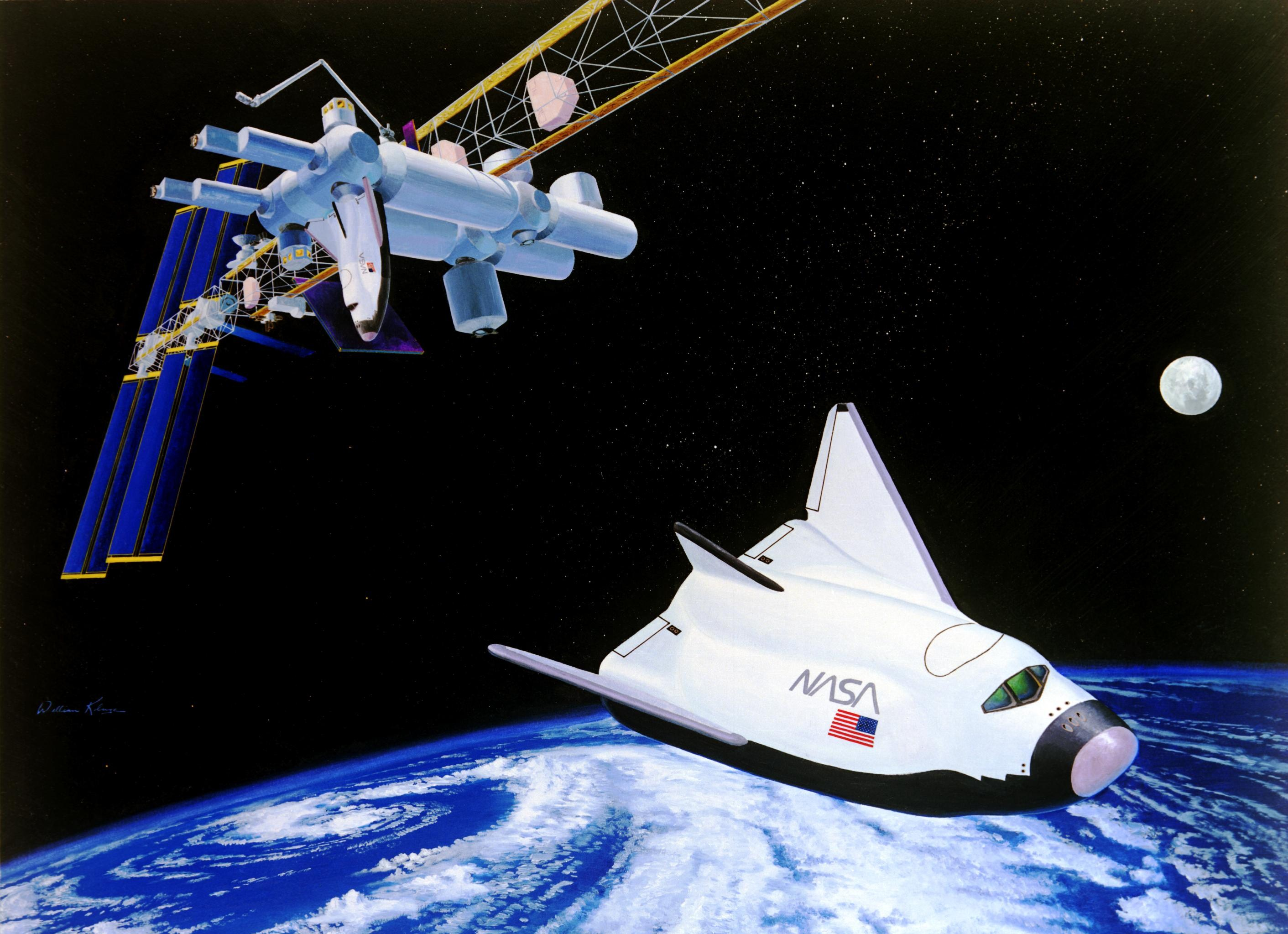
Artist's concept for HL-20 with Space Station Freedom (1990)

In late 1993, Freedom, Mir-2, and the European and Japanese modules were incorporated into a single International Space Station Alpha (ISSA), with Alpha dropped from the name internally by early 1995. In July 1995, the International Space Station Authorization Act of 1995 House report to U.S.Congress was released and the names Freedom, Alpha, and ISSA were no more. By this time, the hardware meant for Space Station Freedom, then Alpha, that had already been designed and built or was in development, around 10 percent, became part of the ISS.

== Station program placed on hold ==
Underestimates by NASA of the station program's cost and unwillingness by the U.S. Congress to appropriate funding for the space station resulted in delays of Freedom's design and construction; it was regularly redesigned and re-scoped. Between 1984 and 1993 it went through seven major re-designs, losing capacity and capabilities each time. Rather than being completed in a decade, as Reagan had predicted, Freedom was never built, and no Shuttle launches were made as part of the program.

The program was managed from NASA Headquarters and a dedicated Level II program office in Reston, Virginia. Key program leadership during the 1989–1993 period included Arnold Aldrich as Associate Administrator for Space Systems Development, Richard Kohrs as Space Station Program Director, and Robert W. Moorehead as Deputy Director for Integration and Operations. At the center level, Aaron Cohen served as Johnson Space Center Director and Jack Boykin managed Work Package 2 at JSC.

By 1993, Freedom was politically unviable; the administration had changed, and Congress was tiring of paying yet more money into the station program. In addition, there were open questions over the need for the station. Redesigns had cut most of the science capacity by this point, and the Space Race had ended in 1975 with the Apollo-Soyuz Test Project. NASA presented several options to President Bill Clinton, but even the most limited of these was still seen as too expensive. In June 1993, an amendment to remove space station funding from NASA's appropriations bill failed by one vote in the House of Representatives. That October, a meeting between NASA and the Russian Space Agency agreed to the merger of the projects into what would become the International Space Station. The merger of the project faced opposition by representatives such as Tim Roemer who feared Russia would break the Missile Technology Control Regime agreement and felt the program was far too costly. Proposed bills did not pass Congress.

== Conversion to the International Space Station ==
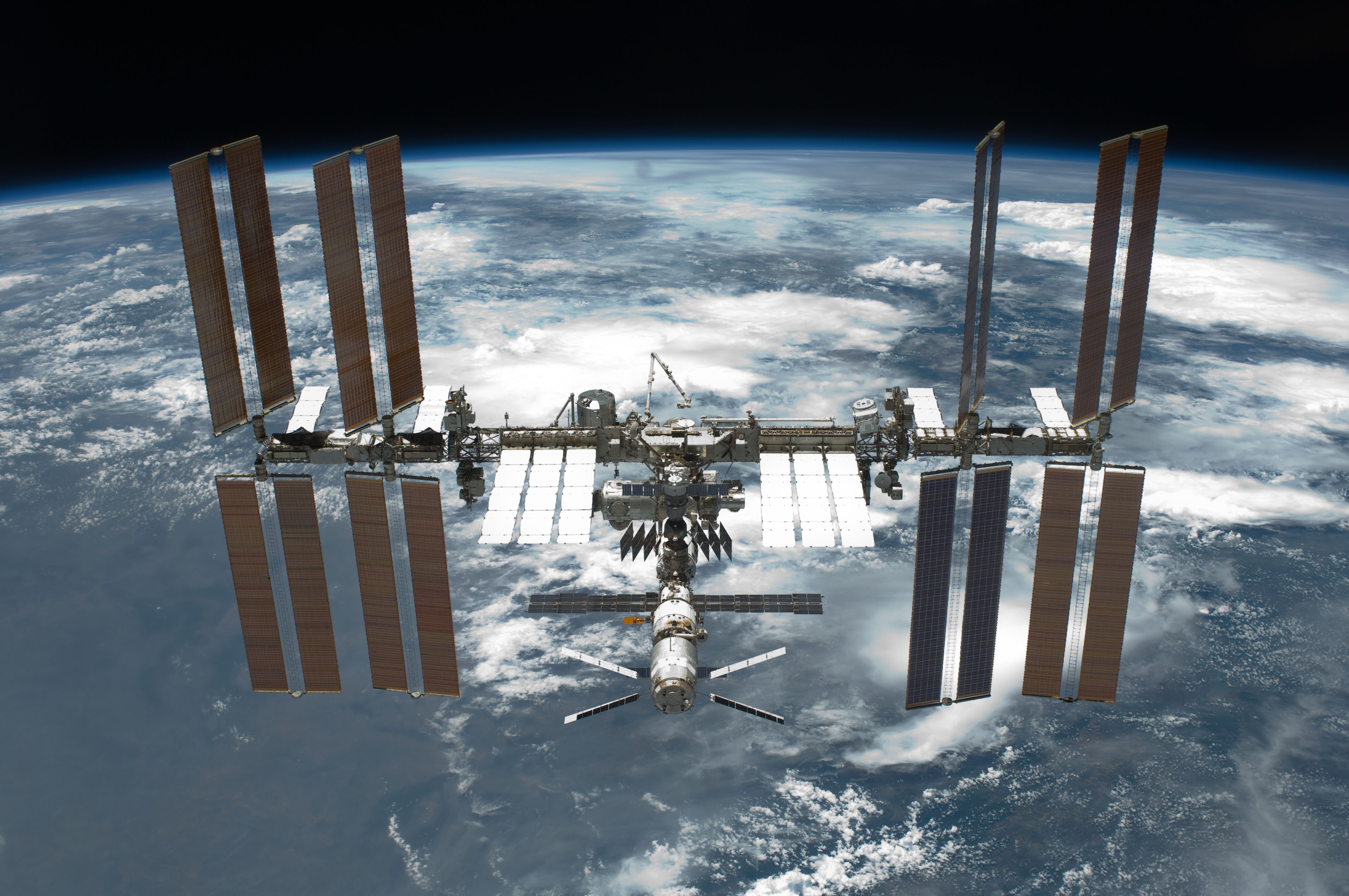
International Space Station in May 2011

In 1993, the Clinton administration announced the transformation of Space Station Freedom into the International Space Station (ISS). NASA administrator Daniel Goldin supervised the addition of Russia to the project. To accommodate reduced budgets, the station design was scaled back from 508 to 353 square feet (47 to 33 m^{2}), the crew capacity of the NASA-provided part was reduced from 7 to 3 (while the complete station was initially crewed by 6 it eventually increased to 7), and the station's functions were reduced. Its first component was launched into orbit in 1998, with the first long-term residents arriving in November 2000.

== See also ==
- Space Exploration Initiative
- HL-20
