= Daniel Goldin =

American engineer and former head of NASA (born 1940)

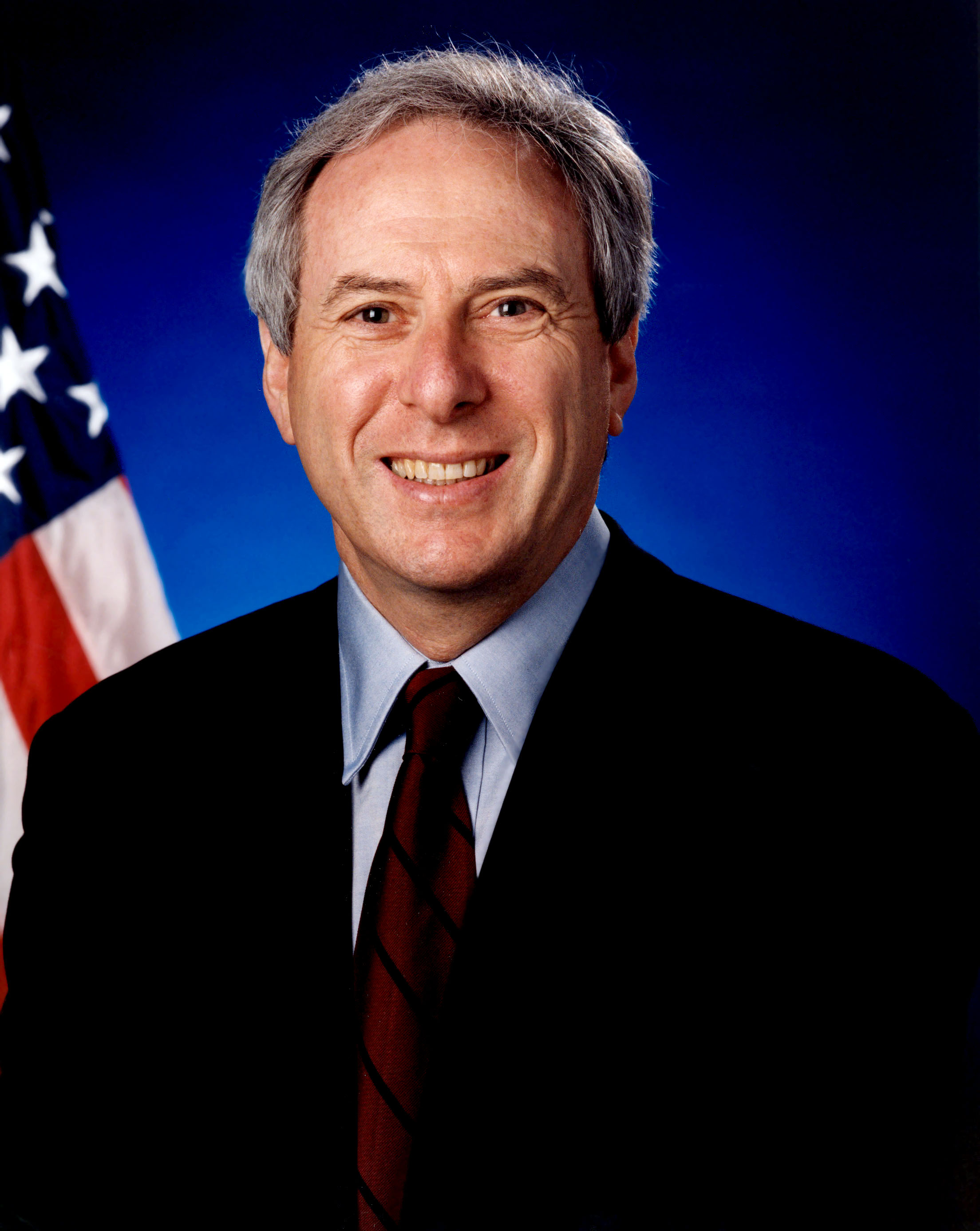

9th Administrator of the National Aeronautics and Space Administration
- In office April 1, 1992 – November 17, 2001
- President: George H. W. Bush; Bill Clinton; George W. Bush
- Preceded by: Richard H. Truly
- Succeeded by: Sean O'Keefe

Personal details
- Born: Daniel Saul Goldin; July 23, 1940 (age 86) New York City, U.S.
- Spouse: Judy Goldin (m. 1962)
- Children: 2
- Education: City College of New York (BS)
- Occupation: Founder of Cold Canyon AI
- Known for: Longest-tenured Administrator of NASA

Daniel Saul Goldin (born July 23, 1940) served as the 9th and longest-tenured administrator of NASA from April 1, 1992, to November 17, 2001. He was appointed by US President George H. W. Bush and also served under presidents Bill Clinton and George W. Bush. He is an entrepreneur and technologist. Most recently, he is the founder of Cold Canyon AI, an innovation advisory company. His career has spanned numerous technologies and businesses in space science, aeronautics, national security, semiconductors, and artificial intelligence.

== Early life ==
Born in New York City to Jewish parents, Louis Goldin and Jean Goldin. He earned a Bachelor of Science degree in mechanical engineering from the City College of New York in 1962.

== Career ==
He began his career at NASA's Glenn Research Center in Cleveland, Ohio, that year (1962), and worked on electric propulsion systems for human interplanetary travel. Goldin left NASA after five years to work at the TRW Space and Technology Group in Redondo Beach, California. Goldin spent 25 years at TRW, climbing to the position of Vice President and General Manager. There, he spent much of his time on classified military and intelligence space programs.

He was NASA Administrator from 1992 to 2001, and was known for his support for a "Faster, better, cheaper" philosophy. He was known as a demanding but efficient manager.

Upon joining NASA, Goldin reflected on the failed Mars Observer project and described his dissatisfaction with the agency's workflow: "so much is riding on each flight that NASA can't afford to have them fail — leading to more caution, delay, and expense." He said to make spacecraft smaller, lighter, and inexpensive, so that NASA could take more risks and not fear making mistakes. He encouraged the team defining what would become the James Webb Space Telescope to use a larger beryllium mirror.

On Friday 22 May 1992, Goldin announced unexpectedly that the "worm" logo would be replaced by the traditional NASA blue "meatball" logo. It had been replaced in 1975 by the NASA red "worm" logo. By 1997, Goldin had started a largely successful campaign within NASA to eradicate the "worm". He would become infuriated and vulgar whenever he would see a "worm" logo that was not replaced. By 1998 the "worm" logo had entirely disappeared from use both in uniforms and in equipment.

In mid-1999 he and senior Agency leadership created the Decadal Planning Team and its successors, which paved the way for NASA's contribution to the Vision for Space Exploration.

On November 17, 2001, President George W. Bush accepted Goldin's resignation as NASA administrator. Goldin was replaced first by Daniel S. Mulville (acting 19 November - 21 December 2001) then by Sean O'Keefe (21 December 2001 - 11 February 2005).

Government offices
Preceded by Richard H. Truly	NASA Administrator; 1992–2001	Succeeded by Daniel Mulville
