= Space Shuttle retirement =

End of NASA Space Shuttle program in 2011

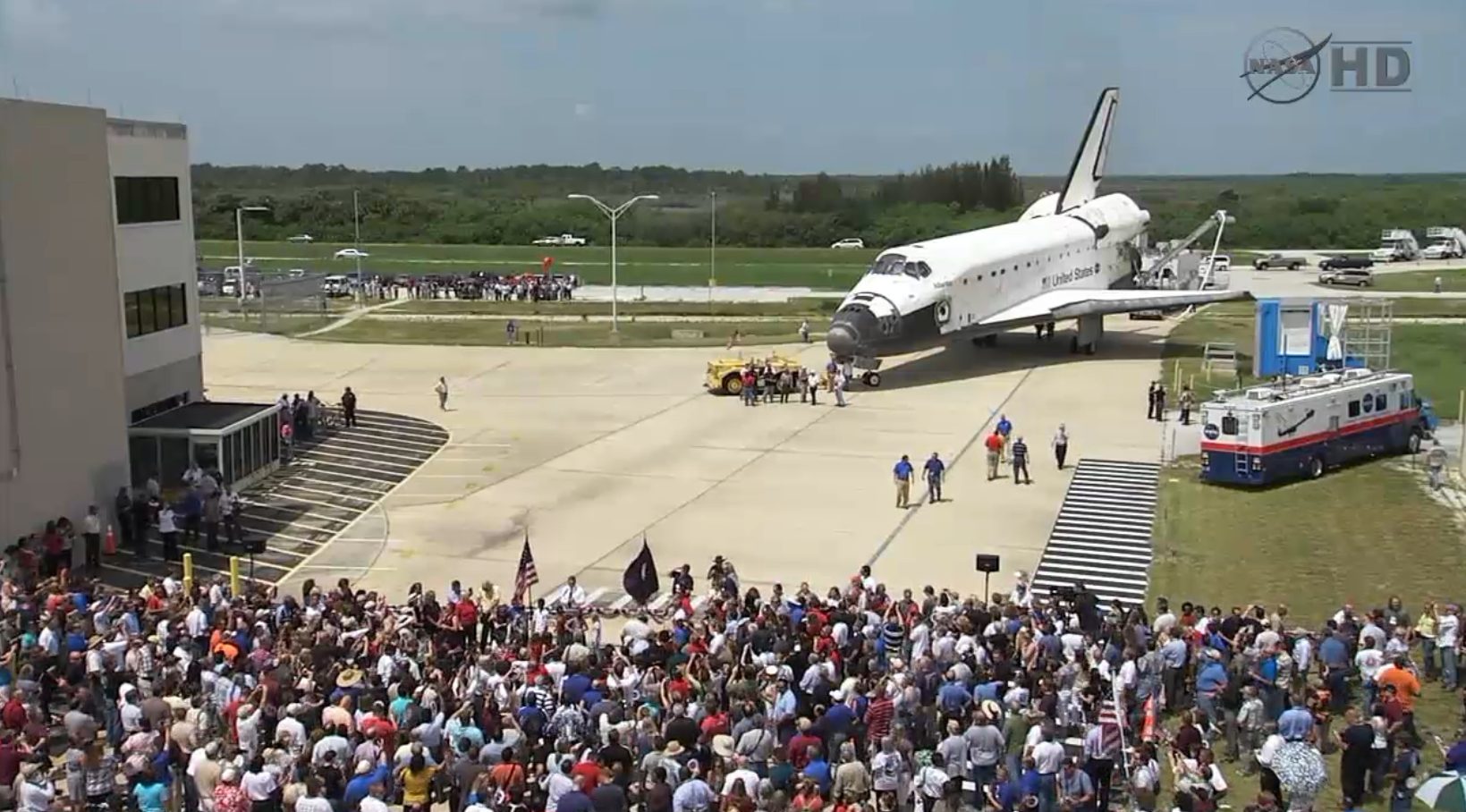
Space Shuttle Atlantis welcome home ceremony after last mission

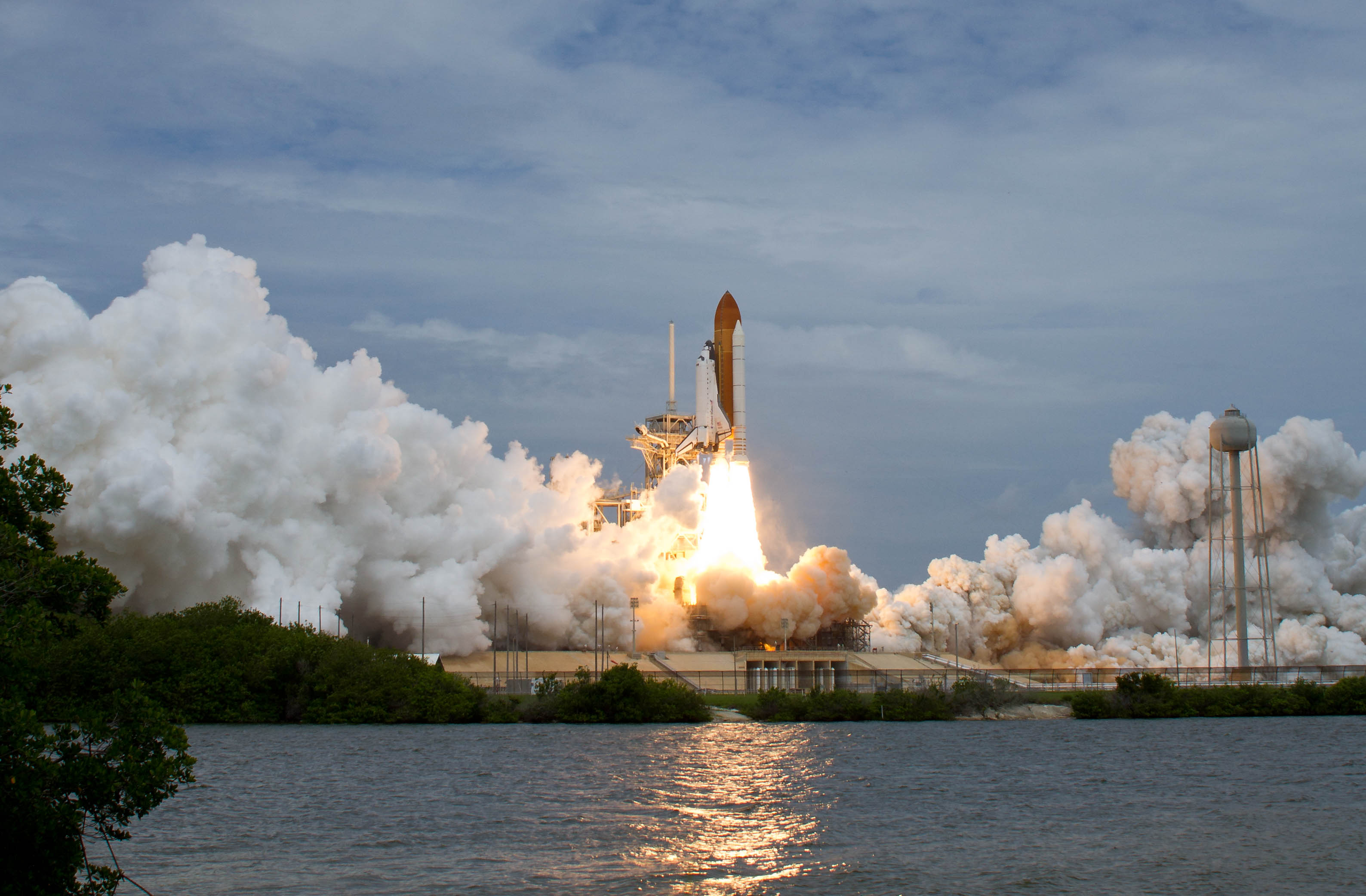
Space Shuttle Atlantis begins the last mission of the Space Shuttle program.

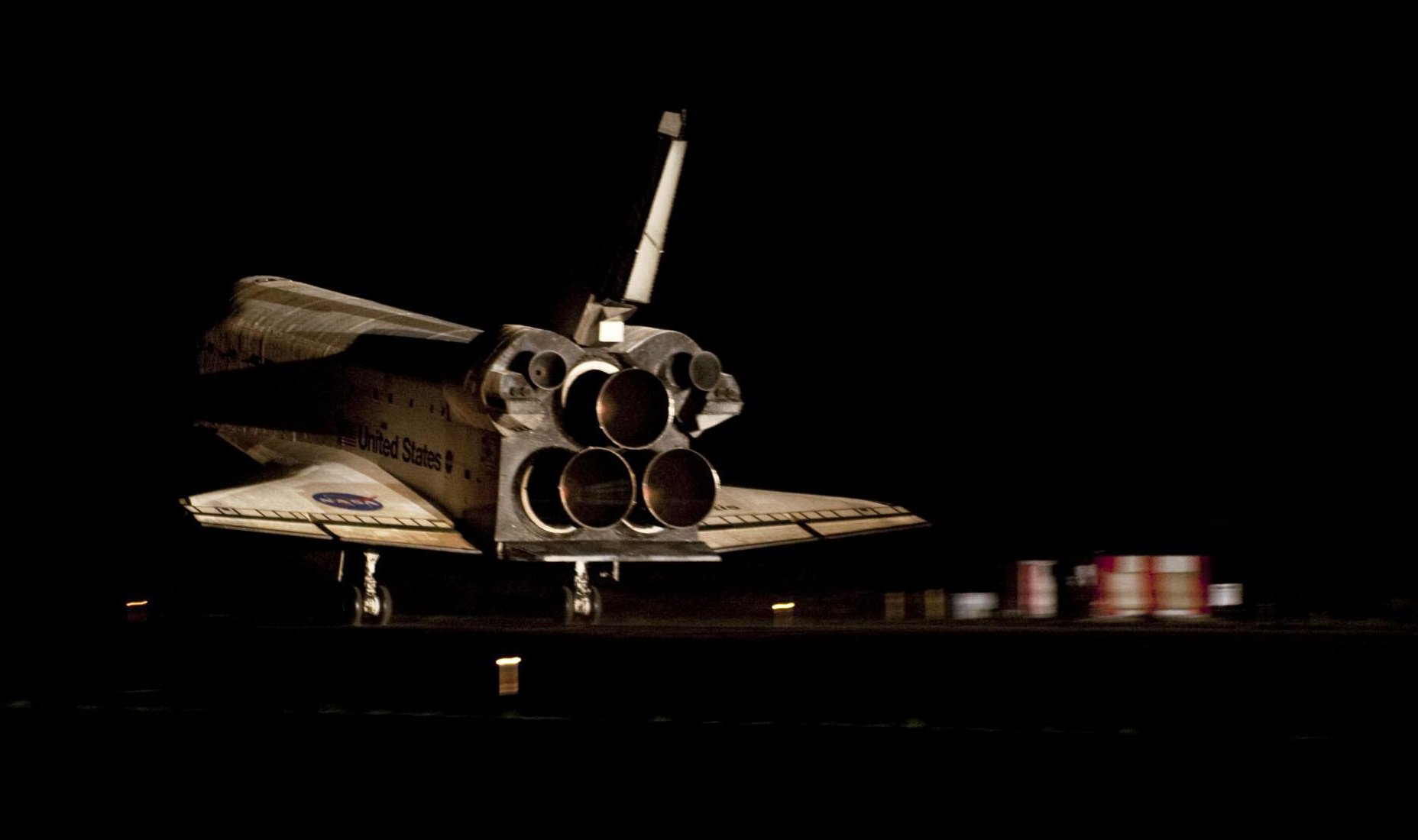
Space Shuttle Atlantis touches down for the final time, July 21, 2011, at the end of STS-135.

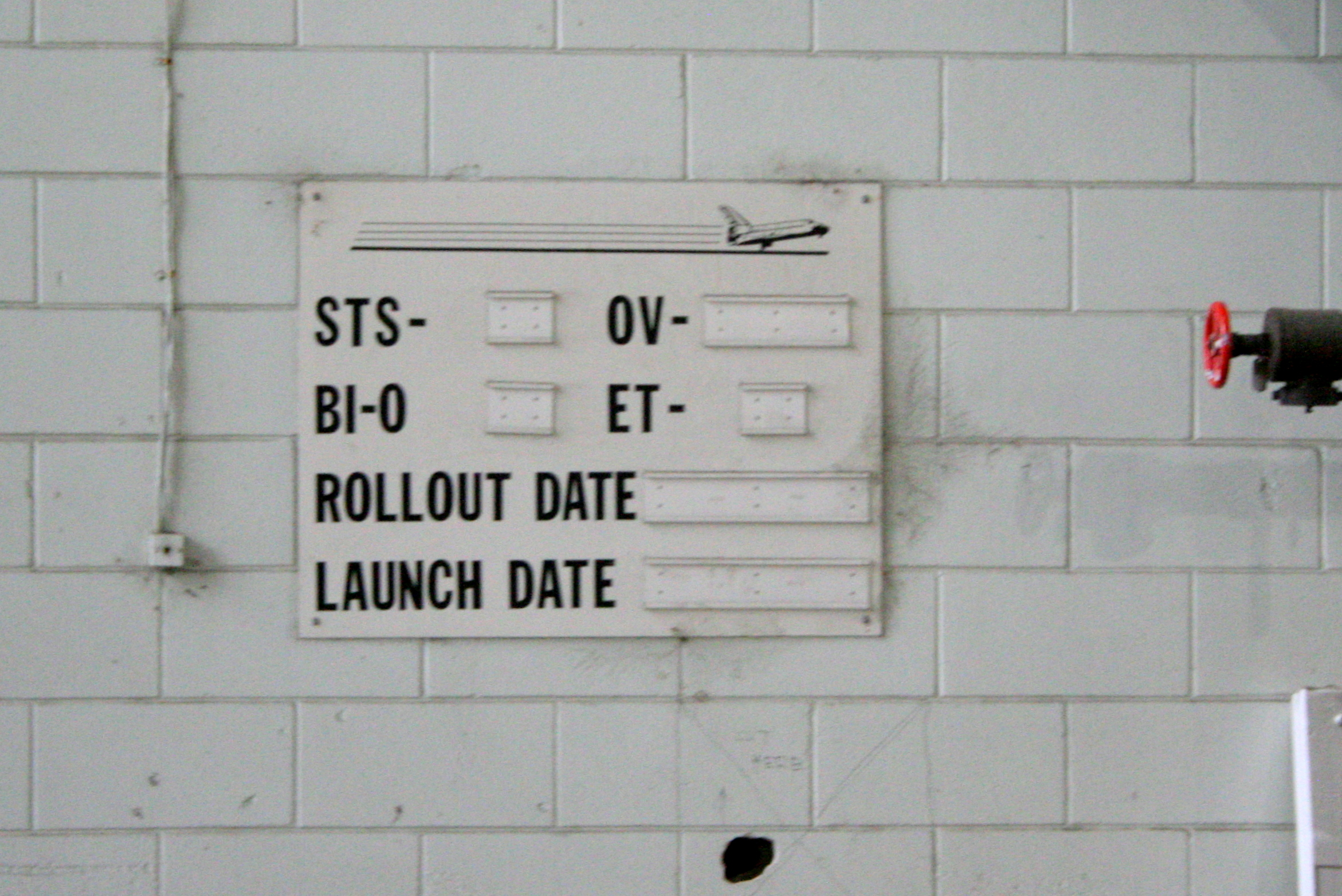
Empty status board in the Vehicle Assembly Building

The retirement of NASA's Space Shuttle fleet took place from March to July 2011. Discovery was the first of the three active Space Shuttles to be retired, completing its final mission on March 9, 2011; Endeavour did so on June 1. The final shuttle mission was completed with the landing of Atlantis on July 21, 2011, closing the 30-year Space Shuttle program.

The Space Shuttle was originally presented to the public in 1972 as a "space truck" which would, among other things, be used to build a United States space station in low Earth orbit in the early 1990s and then be replaced by a new vehicle. When the concept of the U.S. space station evolved into that of the International Space Station (ISS), which suffered from long delays and design changes before it could be completed, the service life of the Space Shuttle fleet was extended several times until 2011 when it was finally retired.

After the Columbia loss in 2003, the Columbia Accident Investigation Board report showed that the Space Transportation System (STS) was risky and unsafe. In 2004, President George W. Bush announced (along with the VSE policy) that the Shuttles would be retired in 2010 (after completing ISS assembly).

In 2010, Shuttle retirements began, with Atlantis being taken out of service first after STS-132 in May of that year. The program was once again extended when the two final planned missions were delayed until 2011. Later, one additional mission was added for Atlantis for July 2011, extending the program further. Counter-proposals to the shuttle's retirement were considered by Congress and the prime contractor United Space Alliance as late as Spring 2010.

== Fate of surviving STS program hardware ==
Hardware developed for the Space Shuttle met various ends at the conclusion of the program, including donation, disuse, disposal, or reuse. An example of reuse is that one of the three Multi-Purpose Logistics Modules (MPLM) was converted into a permanent module for the International Space Station.

=== Space Shuttle Orbiters ===
More than twenty organizations submitted proposals for the display of an orbiter in their museums. On April 12, 2011, NASA announced that the 4 remaining Space Shuttle orbiters will be displayed permanently at these locations:

Shuttle Name	Shuttle Designation	Retirement Destination
Enterprise*	OV-101	Intrepid Museum New York City, New York
Discovery	OV-103	Steven F. Udvar-Hazy Center Chantilly, Virginia
Atlantis	OV-104	Kennedy Space Center Visitor Complex Merritt Island, Florida
Endeavour	OV-105	California Science Center Los Angeles, California

^{*Prior to its move to Intrepid Museum, Enterprise was originally displayed in the Steven F. Udvar-Hazy Center, from 2003 to 2011.}

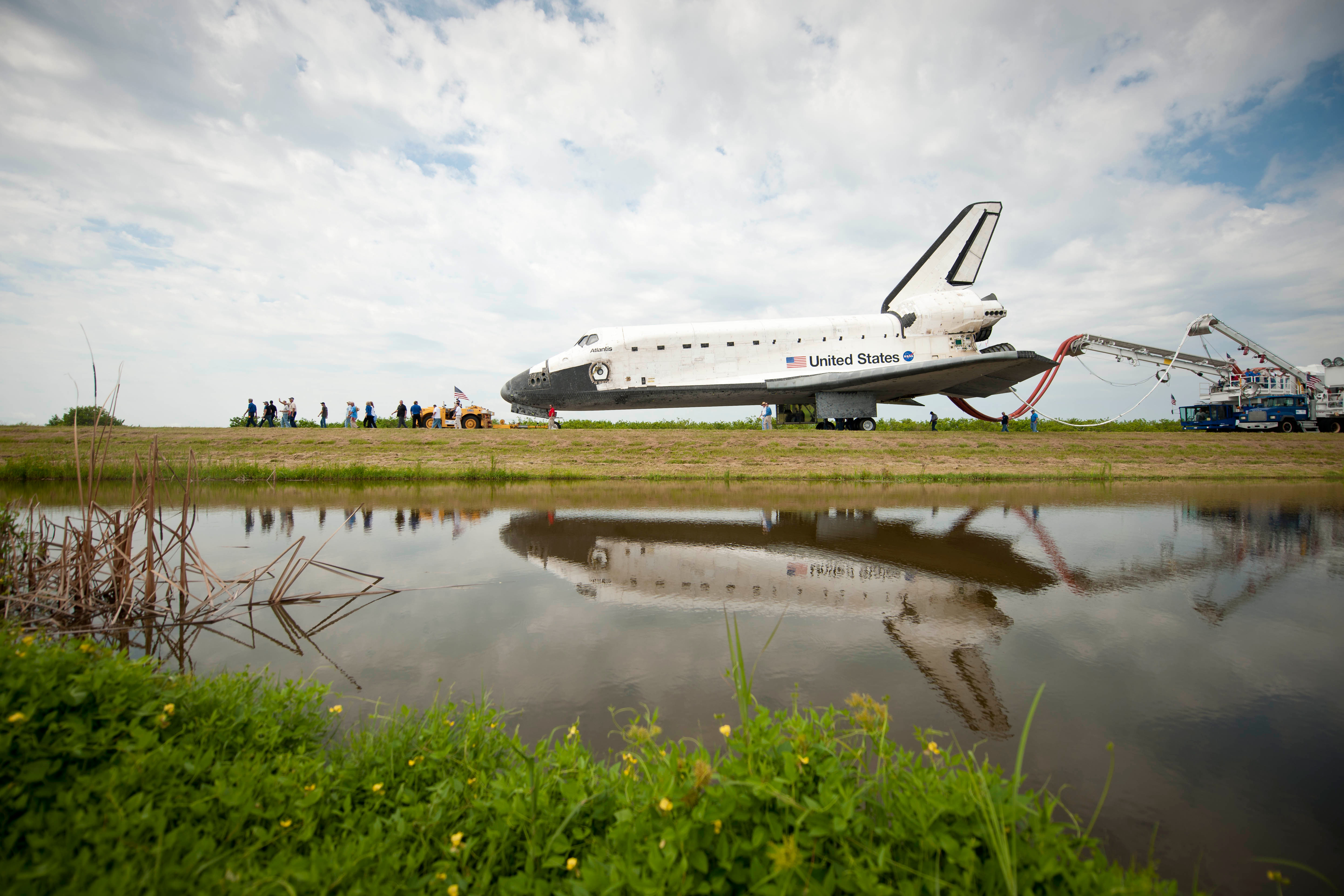
Space Shuttle Atlantis towed back to the Orbiter Processing Facility for the last time at the end of the Shuttle program

Museums and other facilities not selected to receive an orbiter were disappointed. Elected officials representing Houston, Texas, location of the Johnson Space Center; and Dayton, Ohio, location of the National Museum of the United States Air Force, called for Congressional investigations into the selection process, though no such action was taken. While local and Congressional politicians in Texas questioned if partisan politics played a role in the selection, former JSC Director Wayne Hale wrote, "Houston didn't get an orbiter because Houston didn't deserve it", pointing to weak support from area politicians, media and residents, describing a "sense of entitlement".

Chicago media questioned the decision not to include the Adler Planetarium in the list of facilities receiving orbiters, pointing to Chicago's 3rd-largest population in the United States. The chair of the NASA committee that made the selections pointed to the guidance from Congress that the orbiters go to facilities where the most people could see them, and the ties to the space program of Southern California (home to Edwards Air Force Base, where nearly half of shuttle flights have ended and home to the plants which manufactured the orbiters and the RS-25 engines), the Smithsonian (curator of the nation's air and space artifacts), the Kennedy Space Center Visitor Complex (where all Shuttle launches originated, and a large tourist draw) and the Intrepid Museum (Intrepid also served as a recovery ship for Project Mercury and Project Gemini). The Adler Planetarium was awarded the Fixed Base Shuttle Mission Simulator, however it remained in storage off-display at the planetarium until 2016, when it was transferred to the Stafford Air and Space Museum in Weatherford, Oklahoma.

In August 2011 the NASA Inspector General released an audit of the display selection process; it highlighted issues which led to the final decision. The Museum of Flight in Seattle, Washington, March Field Air Museum, Riverside, California, Evergreen Aviation and Space Museum, McMinnville, Oregon, National Museum of the U.S. Air Force, Dayton, Ohio, San Diego Air and Space Museum, San Diego, Space Center Houston, Houston, Texas, Tulsa Air and Space Museum & Planetarium, Tulsa, Oklahoma and U.S. Space and Rocket Center, Huntsville, Alabama scored poorly on international access. Additionally, Brazos Valley Museum of Natural History and the Bush Library at Texas A&M, in College Station, Texas scored poorly on museum attendance, regional population and was the only facility found to pose a significant risk in transporting an orbiter there. Overall, the California Science Center scored first and Brazos Valley Museum of Natural History scored last. The two most controversial locations which were not awarded an orbiter, Space Center Houston and National Museum of the U.S. Air Force, finished 2nd to last and near the middle of the list respectively. The report noted a scoring error, which if corrected would have placed the National Museum of the U.S. Air Force in a tie with the Intrepid Museum and Kennedy Visitor Complex (just below the California Science Center), although due to funding concerns the same decisions would have been made.

The Museum of Flight in Seattle, Washington was not selected to receive an orbiter but instead received the three–story Full Fuselage Trainer from the Space Vehicle Mockup Facility at Johnson Space Center in Houston, Texas. Museum officials, though disappointed, were able to allow the public to go inside the trainer, something not possible with an actual orbiter.

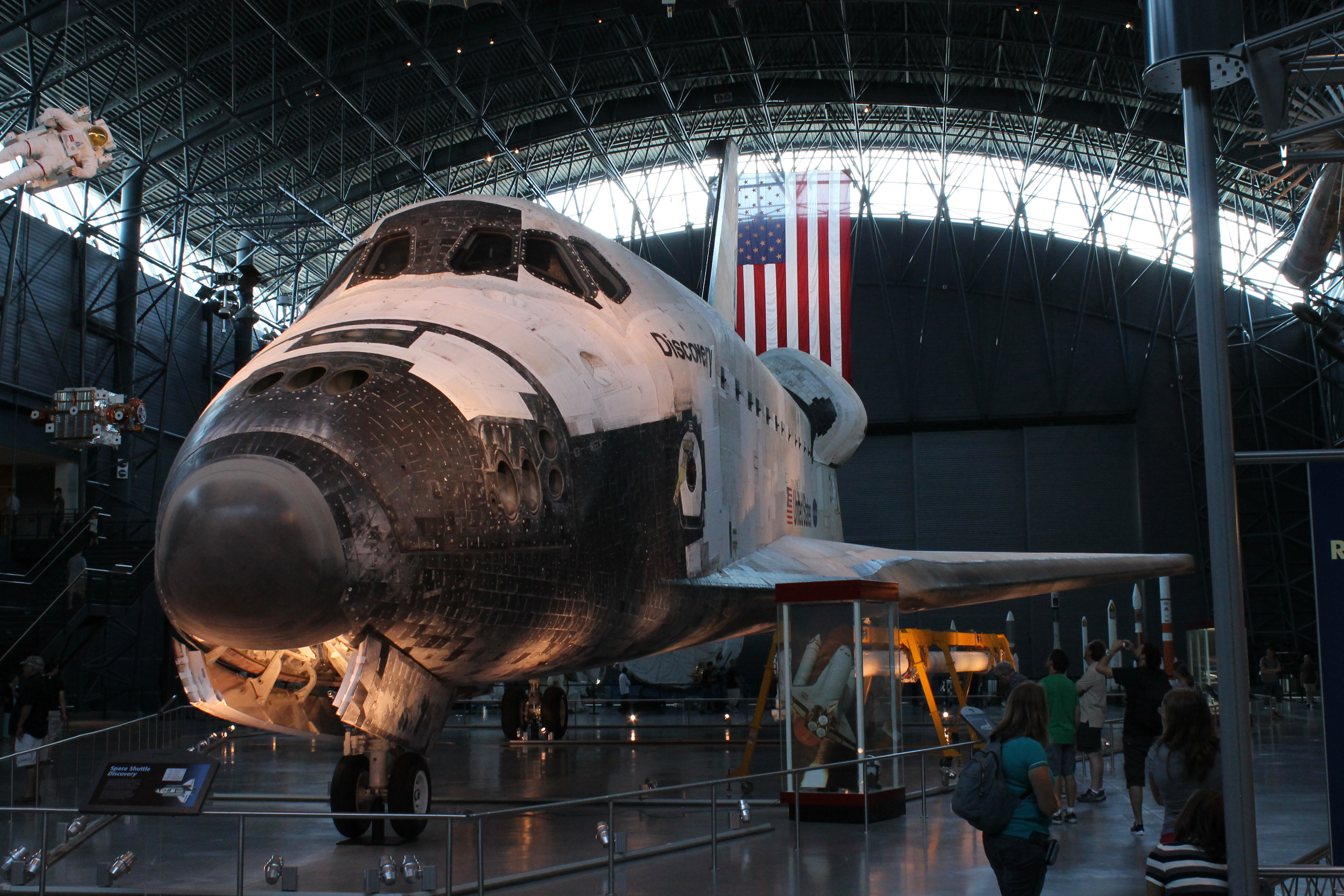
Space Shuttle Discovery on display at the Udvar-Hazy Center for restorations

In addition to the challenge of transporting the large vehicles to the display site, placing the units on permanent display required considerable effort and cost. An article in the February 2012 issue of Smithsonian magazine discussed the work performed on Discovery. It involved removing the three main engines (they were slated to be reused on NASA's Space Launch System); the windows were given to project engineers for analysis of how materials and systems fared after repeated space exposure; the communications modules were removed due to national–security concerns; and hazardous materials such as traces of propellants were thoroughly flushed from the plumbing. The total cost of preparation and delivery via a modified Boeing 747 was estimated at $26.5 million in 2011 dollars.

=== Payload hardware ===
- Spacelab Pallet Elvis: handed over to the Swiss Museum of Transport, Switzerland, in March 2010.
- One of the two Spacelabs: on display at Bremen Airport, Germany.
- Another Spacelab: on display at the Udvar-Hazy center behind Discovery
- MPLM Leonardo: converted to the ISS Permanent Multipurpose Module, currently on-orbit
- MPLM Raffaello: removed from the bay of Atlantis, stored at KSC, transferred in 2023 to Axiom Space for reuse.
- MPLM Donatello: the unused MPLM, some parts were cannibalized for Leonardo. The remainder is mothballed in the ISS processing facility at KSC.
- Various space pallets used since STS-1: the fates of these objects range from space center storage to scrap to museum pieces

=== Tiles ===
NASA ran a program to donate thermal protection system tiles to schools and universities for US$23.40 each (the fee for shipping and handling). About 7000 tiles were available on a first-come, first-served basis, but limited to one per institution. Each orbiter incorporated over 21,000 tiles.

=== RS-25 ===
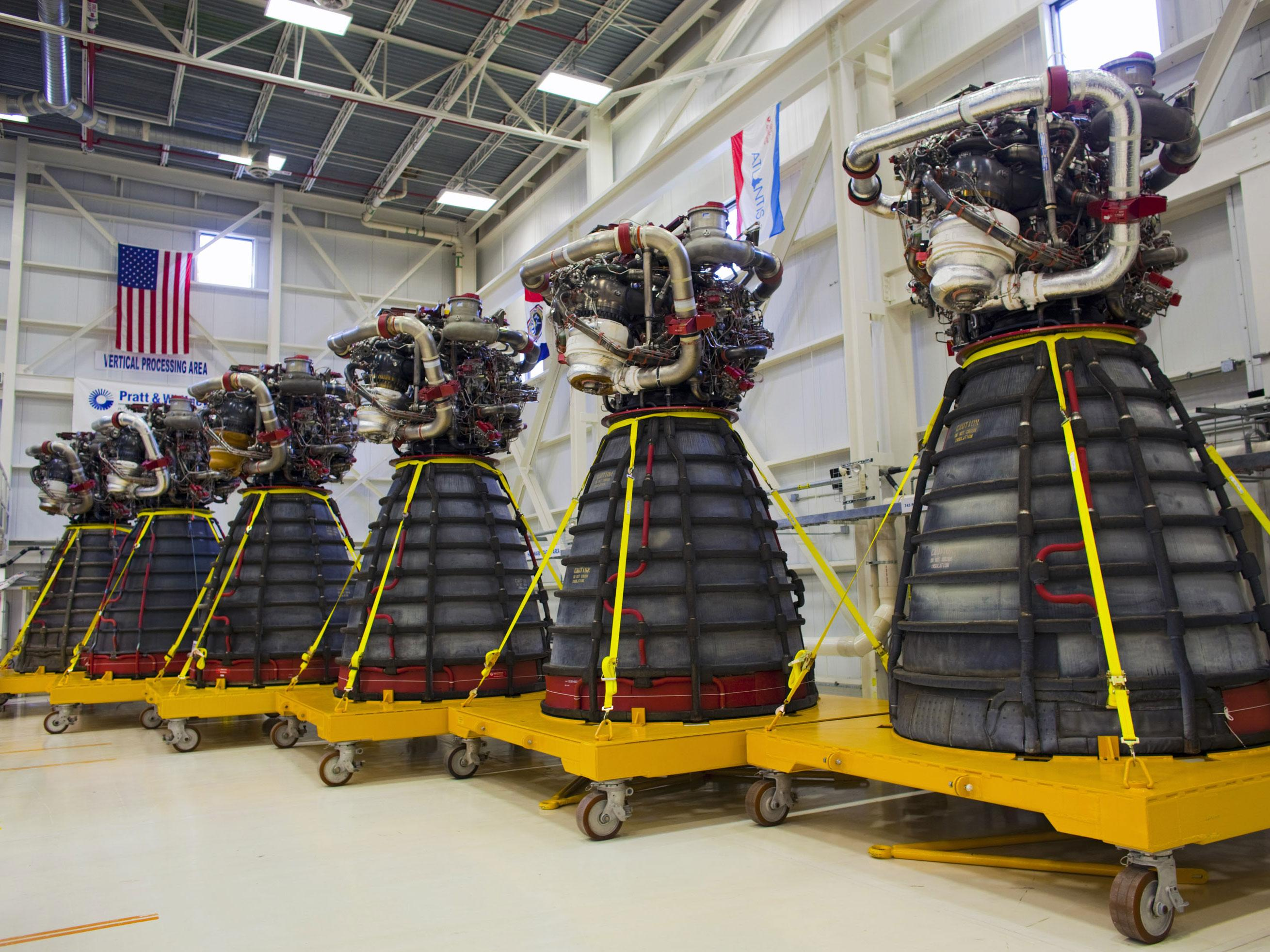
6 RS-25Ds engines used during STS-134 and STS-135 in storage at Kennedy Space Center

About 42 reusable RS-25 engines have been part of the STS program, with three used per orbiter per mission. NASA decided to retain sixteen engines with plans to make use of them on the Space Launch System, where they will be expended. The first flight of the Space Launch System took place in 2022. The remaining engines were donated to the Kennedy Space Center Visitor Complex, Johnson Space Center Space Center Houston, the National Air and Space Museum, and other exhibits around the country.

==== RS-25 nozzles ====
Worn out engine nozzles are typically considered scrap, although nine nozzles were refurbished for display on the donated orbiters, so the actual engines can be retained by NASA.

=== Canadarm (SRMS) and OBSS ===
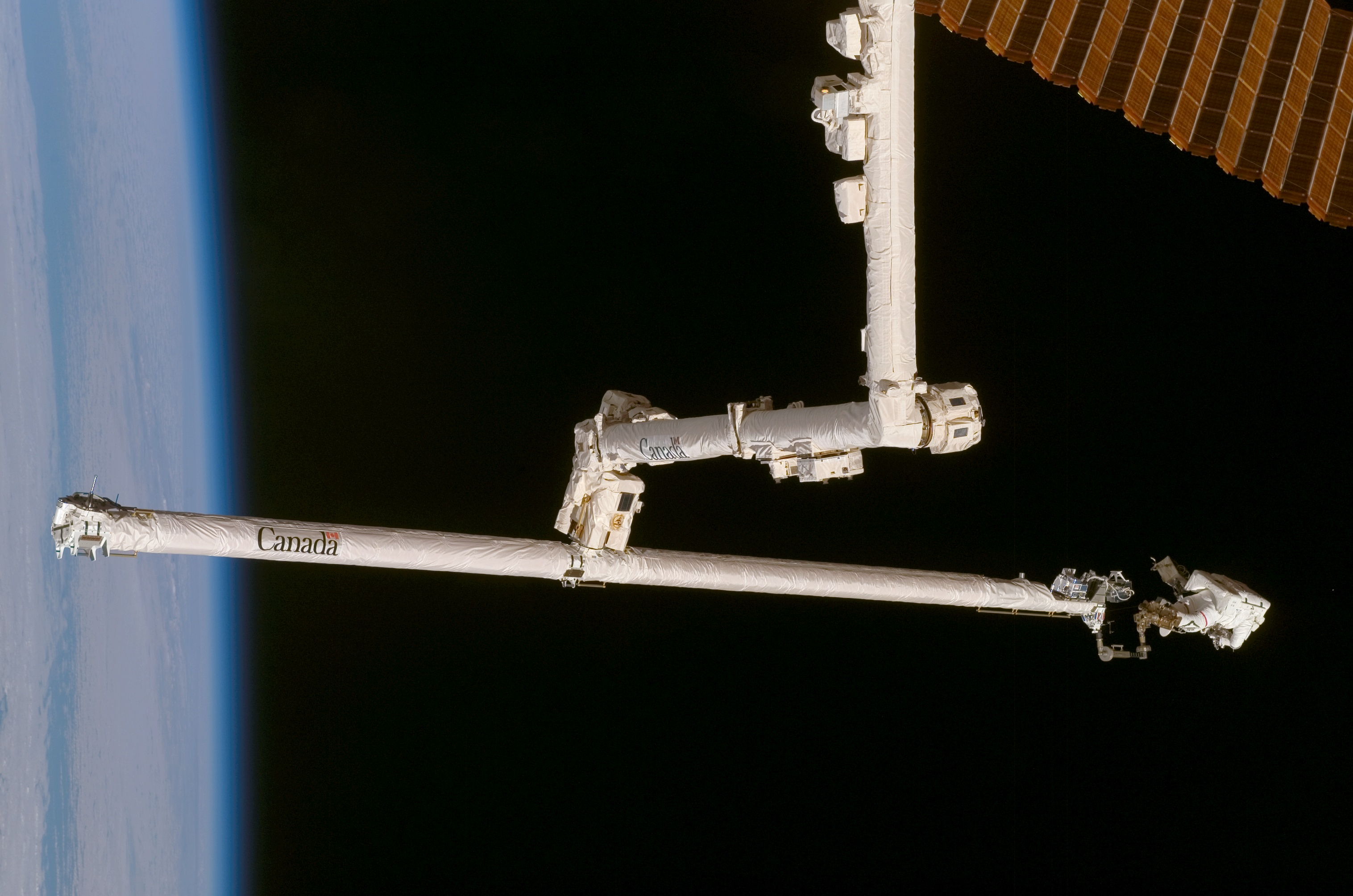
Boom in use on STS-120

Three Shuttle arms (Canadarm) were used by NASA; the arms of both Discovery and Atlantis to be left in place for their museum display and Endeavour's arm to be removed from the orbiter for separate display in Canada. The OBSS extension of Endeavour's arm was left on the International Space Station, for use with the station's robotic arm.

=== Information technology ===
In December 2010, as NASA prepared for the STS program ending, an audit by the NASA Office of Inspector General (OIG) found that information technology had been sold or prepared for sale that still contained sensitive information. NASA OIG recommended NASA be more careful in the future.

=== Other shuttle hardware ===
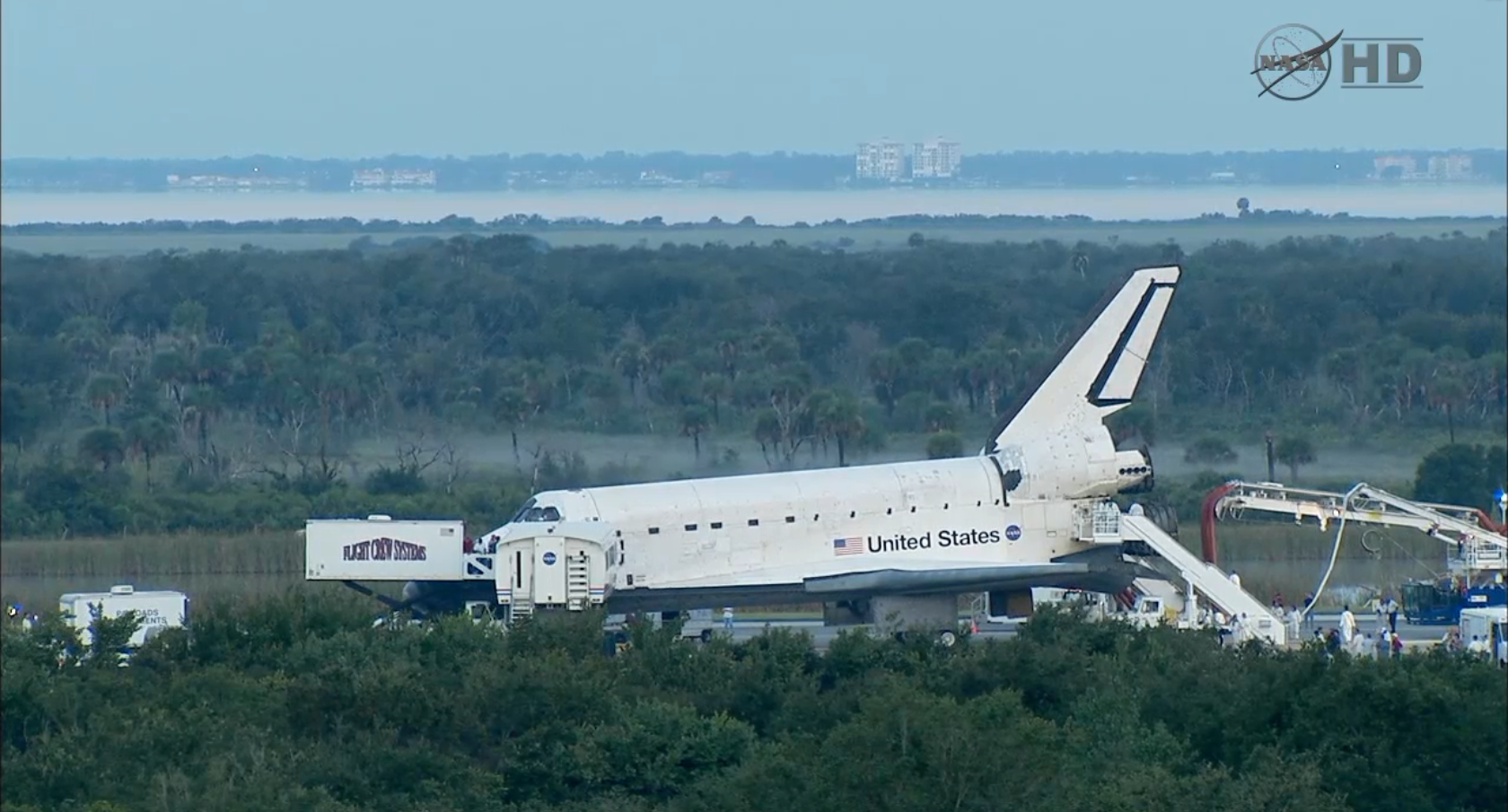
Atlantis about 30 minutes after final touchdown

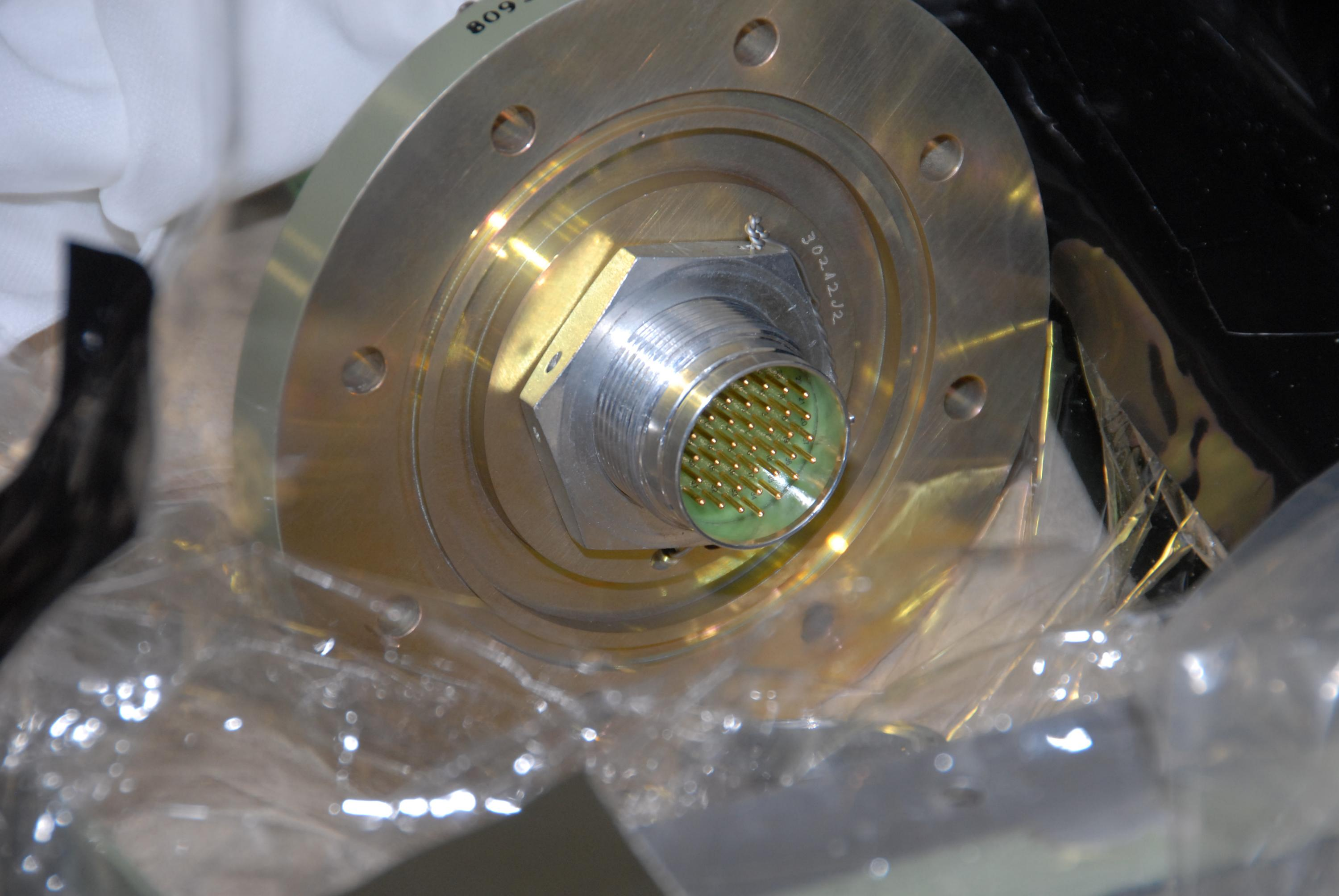
Feed through connector for the main tank: one of many thousands of Shuttle parts

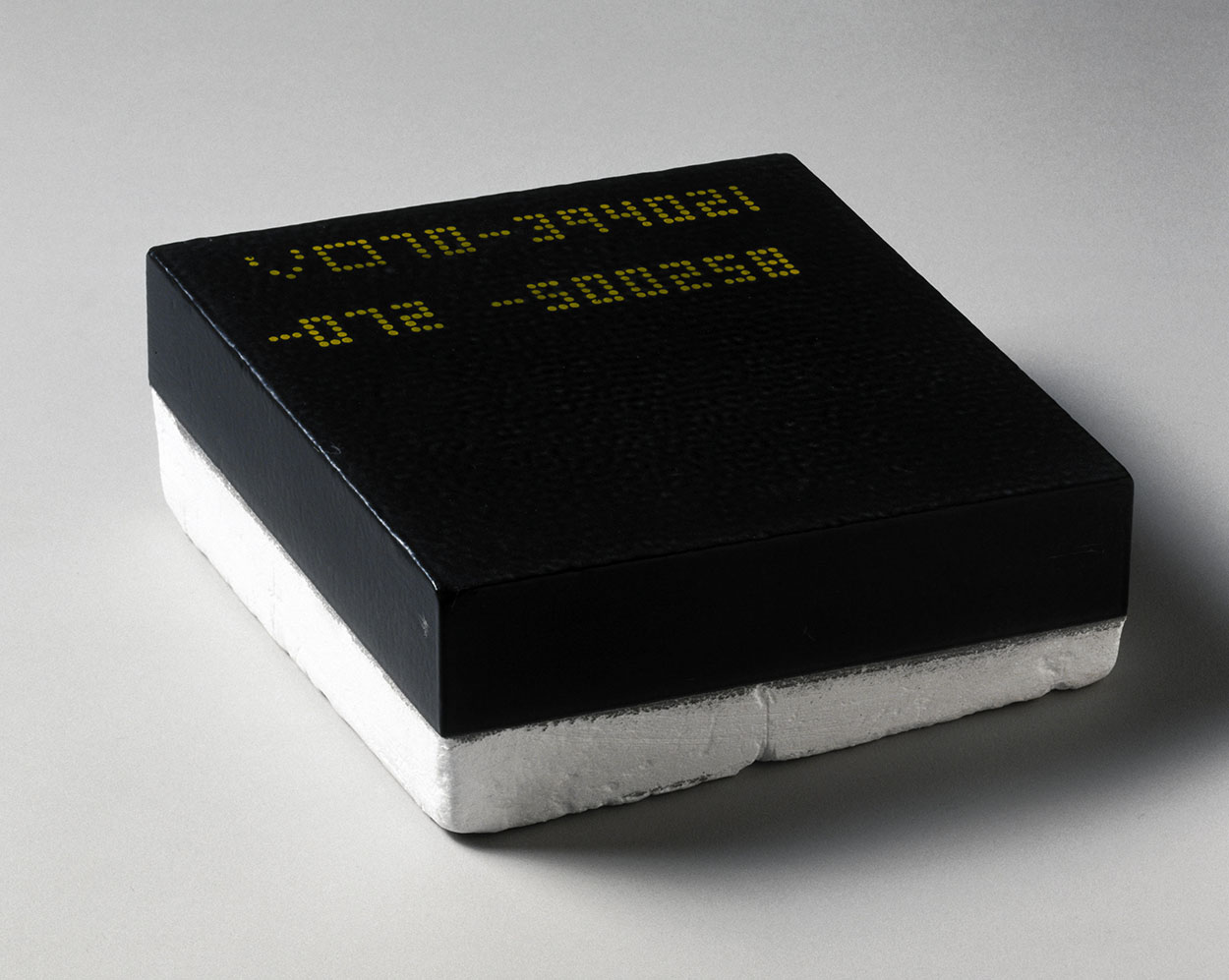
Each Shuttle tile had a specific location on an orbiter and was numbered (in yellow on this tile)

==== KSC Launch Complex 39 ====
The twin pads originally built for the Apollo program were deactivated. LC-39B was deactivated first on January 1, 2007. Three lightning towers were added to the pad and it was temporarily "re-activated" in April 2009 when Endeavour was placed on standby to rescue the STS-125 crew (the STS-125 mission was the last to visit the Hubble Space Telescope, which meant that the ISS was out of range if needed); Endeavour was then moved over to LC-39A for STS-126. In October 2009 the prototype Ares I-X rocket was launched from 39B. The pad was then permanently deactivated and has since been dismantled and has been modified for the Space Launch System program, and possibly other launch vehicles. Like the Apollo structures before them, the shuttle structures were scrapped. The first launch from 39B since Ares I-X was Artemis 1 on November 16th 2022, being the first lunar bound launch from the pad since Apollo 10. 39A was deactivated in July 2011 after STS-135 was launched.

By 2012, NASA came to the conclusion that it would incur material cost to maintain LC-39A even in an inactive state and decided to seek interest of others to lease the pad for their use. NASA solicited and SpaceX won the competition for use of LC-39A. Blue Origin protested the decision to the General Accounting Office (GAO) generating uncertainty of the intent of NASA in the event that a commercial user or users could not be acquired. On January 16, 2013, one or more news outlets erroneously reported that NASA planned to abandon the pad; NASA was quick to clarify and identify that the actual plan was to, like pad B, convert it for other rockets without dismantling it. If NASA did plan to permanently decommission the pads, they would have to restore them to their original Apollo-era appearance, as both pads are on the National Historic Register.

SpaceX has since converted the pad to launch Falcon Heavy and crewed Crew Dragon Falcon 9 flights. Following the destruction of Space Launch Complex 40 in an on-pad explosion in September 2016, SpaceX had to move all east coast launches to 39A while SLC-40 was being rebuilt. The first launch, Dragon resupply vehicle carried by a Falcon 9, occurred February 12, 2017. This flight was the first uncrewed launch from Complex 39 since Skylab was launched in 1973. Once SLC-40 was reactivated, SpaceX finished modifying the pad for Falcon Heavy. Due to SLC-40s destruction, 39A had to be rushed into service, and activities such as dismantling the RSS were put on hold. For the first few missions from 39A, even after SLC-40 was reactivated, SpaceX dismantled the RSS between launches and added black cladding to the fixed service structure.

==== Vehicle Assembly Building ====
After STS-135, the VAB was used as a storage shed for the decommissioned shuttles before they were sent to museums. NASA awarded a contract in March 2014 for design and build/delivery of VAB High Bay 3 modifications to support the SLS program. In February 2017, the contractor team completed platform installation to enable SLS stacking. SLS/Artemis 1 mission processed through VAB Bay 3 prior to its launch in November 2022. Other VAB bays, such as High Bay 2, are being made available by NASA for other programs.

==== Mobile Launcher Platform ====
Three mobile launcher platforms used to support the Space Shuttle were to be used for commercial launch vehicles.

The Mobile Launcher Platform-1 (MLP-1) was used for 62 Shuttle launches, starting in 1981. It was the most used of the three MLPs.

The Ares I-X suborbital mission utilized the MLP-1 to support the stacking and launch operations. The cancelled Ares I-Y would have used the same MLP. Following the STS-135, usable parts from MLP-1 were removed and stored in the Vehicle Assembly Building, with no plans to use the MLP again. Eventually the MLP was weighed down with concrete blocks and used for conditioning the crawlerway for SLS as of September 2021.

Mobile Launcher Platform-2 (MLP-2) was used for 44 Shuttle launches, starting in 1983. All of the orbiters except Columbia made their maiden flights from MLP-2. It was also the launch site for the ill-fated STS-51L mission, when Space Shuttle Challenger disintegrated shortly after launch, killing all seven crew members. in January 2021 MLP-2 was scrapped, as with 2 more MLPs for SLS under construction, NASA was running out of places to store the launch platforms.

Mobile Launcher Platform-3 (MLP-3) was used for 29 Shuttle launches, starting in 1990. It was the least used of the three MLPs.

The MLP-3 was acquired by Orbital ATK (who was later bought out by Northrop Grumman) to launch their future OmegA rocket. They planned to use the Vehicle Assembly Building High Bay 2 to assemble the rocket, and crawler-transporter 1 to move the rocket to LC-39B for launch. Unfortunately, due to a lack of Federal Funds, Omega was cancelled in September 2020, leaving MLP-3 without a tenant.

==== Crawler-Transporter ====
The Crawler-Transporters were used as the mobile part of the pad with the Shuttles; the two vehicles were deactivated and are being upgraded for the Space Launch System. The crawlerways used for transporting launch vehicles from the VAB to the twin pads of KSC are also being extensively renovated for the Artemis program.

==== Shuttle Carrier Aircraft ====
Two modified Boeing 747s were used to fly the shuttles back to KSC when they landed at Edwards AFB. N911NA was retired on February 8, 2012, and became a parts hulk for the former Stratospheric Observatory for Infrared Astronomy. Beginning in September 2014, N911NA was loaned out to the Joe Davies Heritage Airpark, in Palmdale, California, where it is on outdoor display next to a B-52. The other aircraft, N905NA was used to send Discovery, Endeavour and Enterprise to their museums and in September 2012 was found to have few parts for SOFIA. It is currently a museum piece at the Johnson Space Center, displayed carrying a full-scale replica of an orbiter.

==== NASA recovery ships ====
Used to retrieve the SRBs, MV Liberty Star and Freedom Star are now separated. Liberty Star was renamed as TV Kings Pointer and was transferred to the Merchant Marine Academy in New York for use as a training vessel. It will remain on call in case NASA needs it for further missions. Freedom Star was transferred to the James River Reserve Fleet on September 28, 2012, and placed under ownership of the U.S. Maritime Administration (MARAD). In November 2016, MV Freedom Star was re-purposed as a training vessel to the Paul Hall Center for Maritime Training and Education, on loan from MARAD.

==== Orbiter Processing Facility ====
The buildings used to process the shuttles after each mission were decommissioned. OPF-1 was leased to Boeing in January 2014 for processing the X-37B spaceplane. Once the agreement for use was signed between NASA and the U.S. Air Force and made public, use of both OPF-1 and OPF-2 for X-37B was confirmed. OPF-3 was leased as well to Boeing for 15 years to use in the manufacture and test of the CST-100 spacecraft.

==== Shuttle Landing Facility ====
The runway at KSC is evolving as a Launch and Landing Facility (LLF) to support multiple users including a group of F-104 aircraft, use by launch providers for delivery of rocket stages by aircraft, availability for spaceflight horizontal launch and landing, and for other uses supporting both Kennedy Space Center and adjacent Cape Canaveral Space Force Station. It is used to land the X-37B and will be for Sierra Nevada Dream Chaser spaceplanes. The LLF received its first landing from space since Atlantis when the USAF X-37B landed on it at the end of almost two years in orbit in June 2017.

== Former planned Space Shuttle successors ==
There were a number of proposals for space access systems in the 1970s also, such as the Rockwell Star-raker. Star-raker was a large single-stage to orbit (SSTO) design that used both rockets and ramjet for propulsion. It was a contemporary to the Boeing Reusable Aerodynamic Space Vehicle, which was an all-rocket propulsion SSTO design.

Some programs from the early 1980s were the Future Space Transportation System program and the later NASA Advanced Manned Launch System program.

In the late 1980s, a planned successor to STS was called "Shuttle II", which encompassed a number of different ideas including smaller tanks over the wings and a detachable crew cabin for emergencies, and was influenced by the Challenger disaster. At one point before retirement, extension of the Space Shuttle program for an additional five years, while a replacement could be developed, was considered by the U.S. government. Some programs proposed to provide access to space after the shuttle were the Lockheed Martin X-33, VentureStar, the Orbital Space Plane Program, and Ares I launcher.

For comparison to an earlier retirement, when the Saturn IB was last flown in 1975 for the Apollo-Soyuz Test Project, the Shuttle development program was already well underway. However, the Shuttle did not fly until 1981, which left a six-year gap in U.S. human spaceflight. Because of this and other reasons, in particular, higher than expected Solar activity that caused Skylab's orbit to decay faster than hoped, the U.S. space station Skylab burned up in the atmosphere.

The Ares I was going to be NASA's crewed spacecraft after STS, with Congress attempting to accelerate its development so it would be ready as early as 2016 for the ISS, in addition they attempted to delay retirement of the shuttle to reduce the time gap. However, Ares I was cancelled along with the rest of Constellation in 2010. The successor to the Space Shuttle after the cancellation would be commercial crew spacecraft, such as the Dragon 2 from SpaceX which first launched crew on May 30, 2020, as the SpaceX Demo-2 mission, and the Starliner from Boeing which first launched crew on June 5, 2024, as the Boeing CFT mission, while NASA's flagship in-house crewed missions will be aboard Orion on the SLS.

=== Constellation Program ===
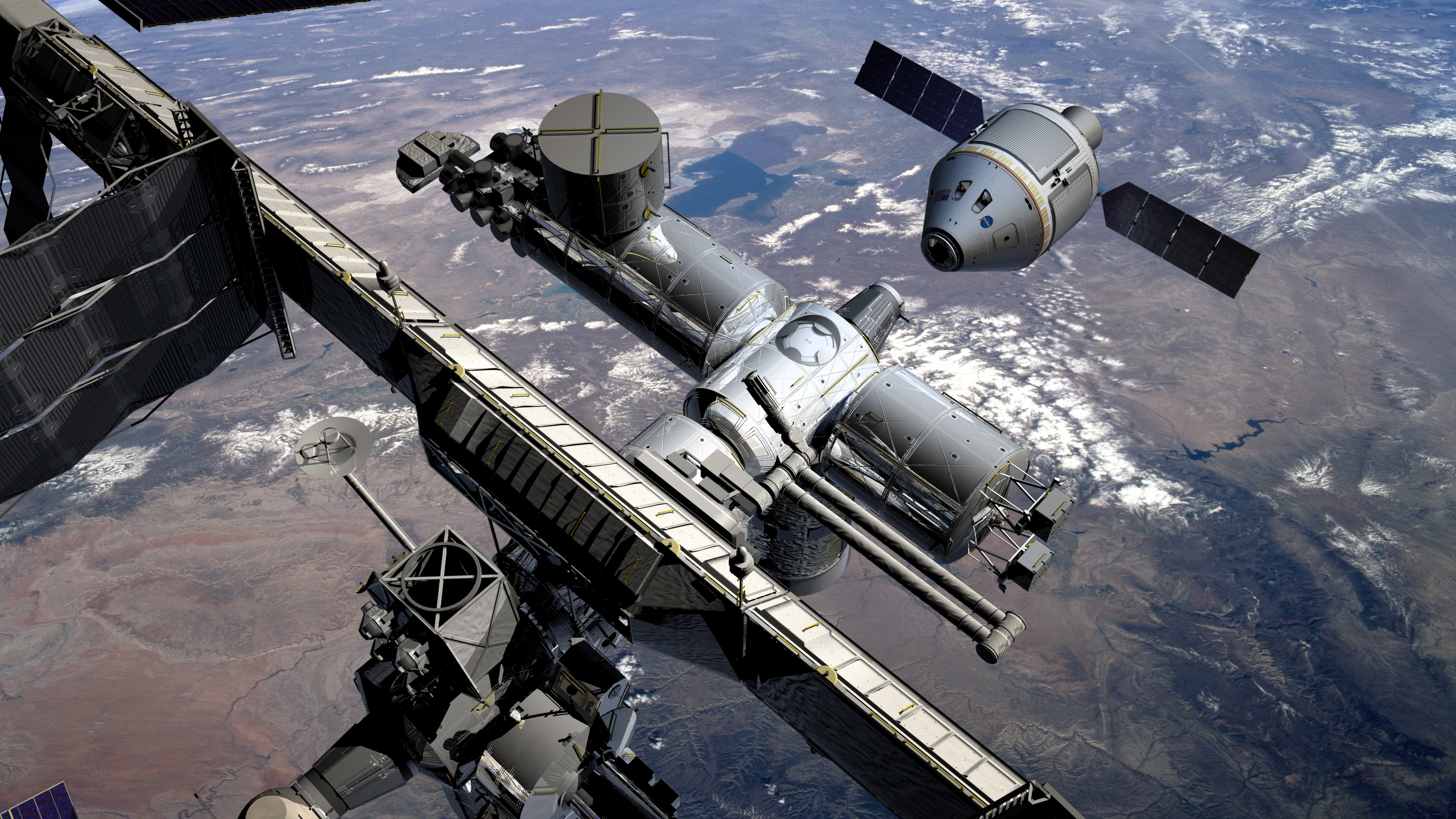
Artist's rendition of the docking of Orion (at right) to the ISS.

Following the Space Shuttle Columbia disaster, in early 2003 President George W. Bush, announced his Vision for Space Exploration which called for the completion of the American portion of the International Space Station by 2010 (due to delays this would not happen until 2011), the retirement of the Space Shuttle fleet following its completion, to return to the Moon by 2020 and one day to Mars. A new vehicle would need to be developed, it eventually was named the Orion spacecraft, a six-person variant would have serviced the ISS and a four-person variant would have traveled to the Moon. The Ares I would have launched Orion, and the Ares V heavy-lift vehicle (HLV) would have launched all other hardware. The Altair lunar lander would have landed crew and cargo onto the Moon. The Constellation program experienced many cost overruns and schedule delays, and was openly criticized by the subsequent U.S. president, Barack Obama.

In February 2010, the Obama administration proposed eliminating public funds for the Constellation program and shifting greater responsibility of servicing the ISS to private companies. During a speech at the Kennedy Space Center on April 15, 2010, President Obama proposed the design selection of the new HLV that would replace the Ares-V but would not occur until 2015. The U.S. Congress drafted the NASA Authorization Act of 2010 and President Obama signed it into law on October 11 of that year. The authorization act officially cancelled the Constellation program.

The development of the combination of Ares I and Orion was predicted to cost about US$50 billion. One of the issues with Ares I was the criticism of the second stage, which the post-cancellation Liberty proposal attempted to address by using a second stage from an Ariane 5. The Liberty proposal applied for but was not chosen for commercial crew. The other ongoing complaint was that it made more sense to make a man-rated version of the Atlas or Delta. The first crewed flight for Ares I was scheduled for March 2015, and one of its priorities was crew safety. One reason for the emphasis on safety was that it was envisioned in the aftermath of the Columbia disaster.

== Current and future Space Shuttle successors ==
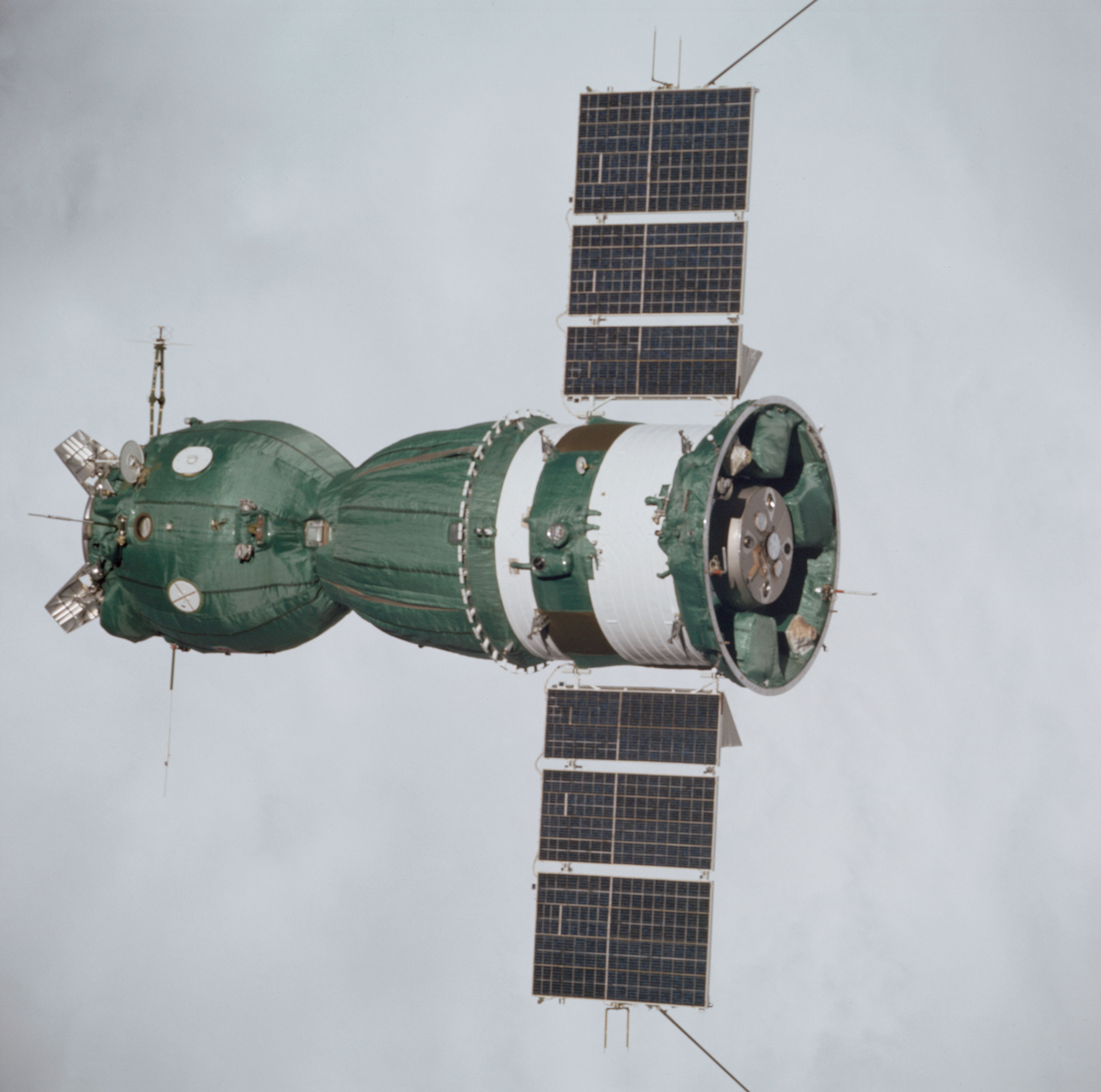
NASA's first direct action with the Soyuz was in 1975, as part of the Apollo-Soyuz Test Project (pictured). As the ISS lifeboat spacecraft all participants needed to train on it in the event of an emergency, if they stayed after the Shuttle left. NASA used the Soyuz concurrently with STS system as far back as 2000, and many other ISS participants have also used this spacecraft to access the space station

=== Soyuz ===
U.S. astronauts have continued to access the ISS aboard the Russian Soyuz spacecraft. The Soyuz was chosen as the ISS lifeboat during the development of the International Space Station. The first NASA astronaut to launch on a Soyuz rocket was Norman Thagard, as part of the Shuttle-Mir program. Launching on March 14, 1995, on Soyuz TM-21, he visited the Mir however he returned to Earth on the Space Shuttle mission STS-71. The start of regular use of the Soyuz began as part of the International Space Station program, with William Shepherd launching on Soyuz TM-31 in October 2000. NASA has continued to take regular flights in the following two decades. NASA was contracted to use Soyuz seats until at least 2018.

The consideration of Soyuz as a lifeboat began in the aftermath of the dissolution of the Soviet Union. Russia proposed using the Soyuz as a lifeboat for what was still Space Station Freedom in late 1991, leading to further analysis of this concept in the early 1990s. One of the milestones was in 1992, when after three months of negotiations the heads of the two Space Agencies agreed to study applications of the Soyuz spacecraft.

In March 1992, Russian and US space officials discussed the possibility of cooperation in manned space program, including ACRV. On June 18, 1992, after three months of negotiations, NASA Administrator Daniel S. Goldin and Director General of the Russian Space Agency Yuri Nikolayevich Koptev, "ratified" a contract between NASA and NPO-Energia to study possible application of the Soyuz spacecraft and Russian docking port in the Freedom project

— NASA Astronauts on Soyuz: Experience and Lessons for the Future, 2010

Since the first NASA use of Soyuz in 1995, NASA astronauts have flown on the following Soyuz versions: Soyuz-TM, Soyuz-TMA (and Soyuz TMA-M), Soyuz MS (which had its first flight in 2016).

NASA also purchased several space modules from Russia including Spektr, Docking Module (Mir), Priroda, and Zarya.

=== Orion and the SLS ===
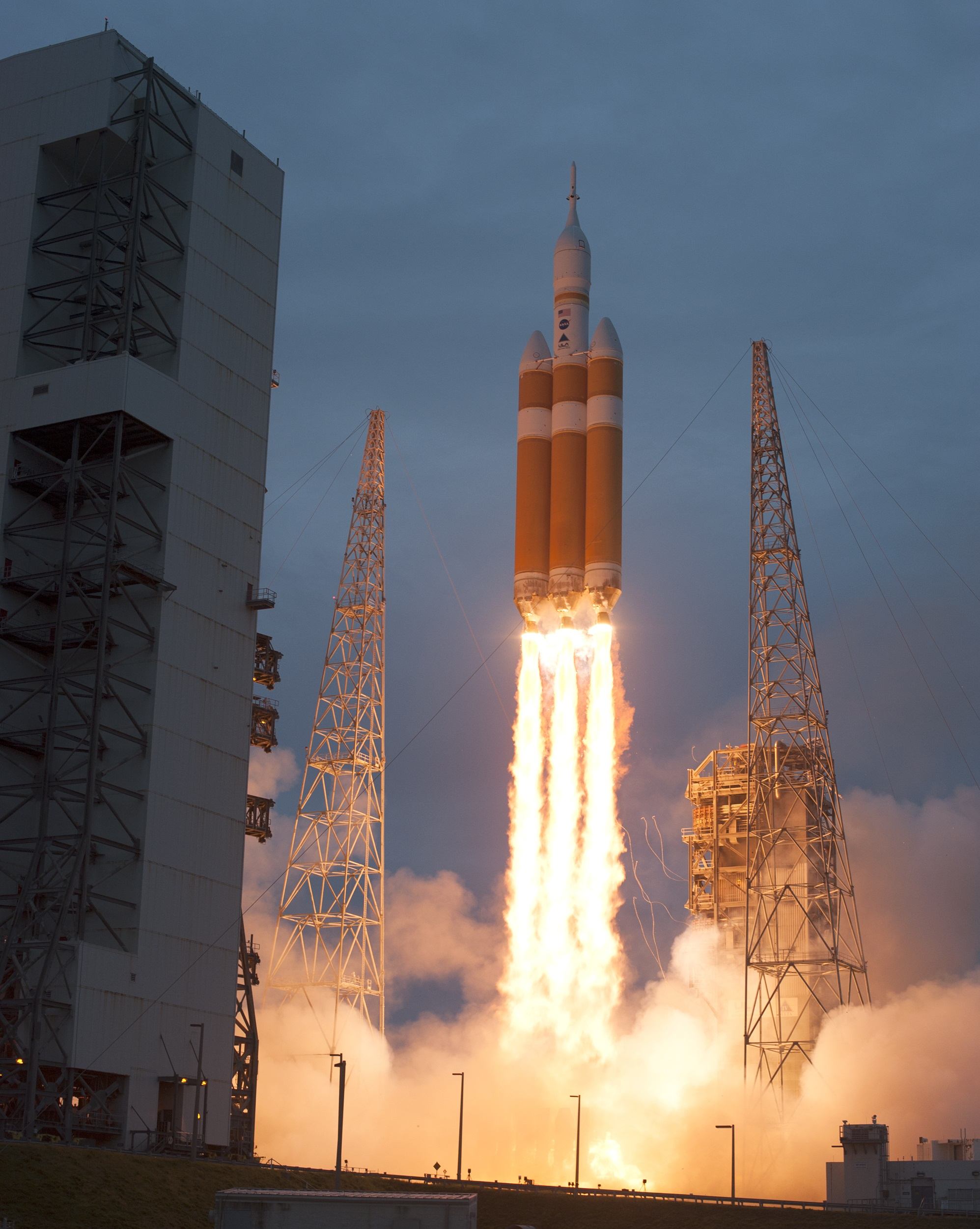
Orion test launches on a Delta IV Heavy, 2014

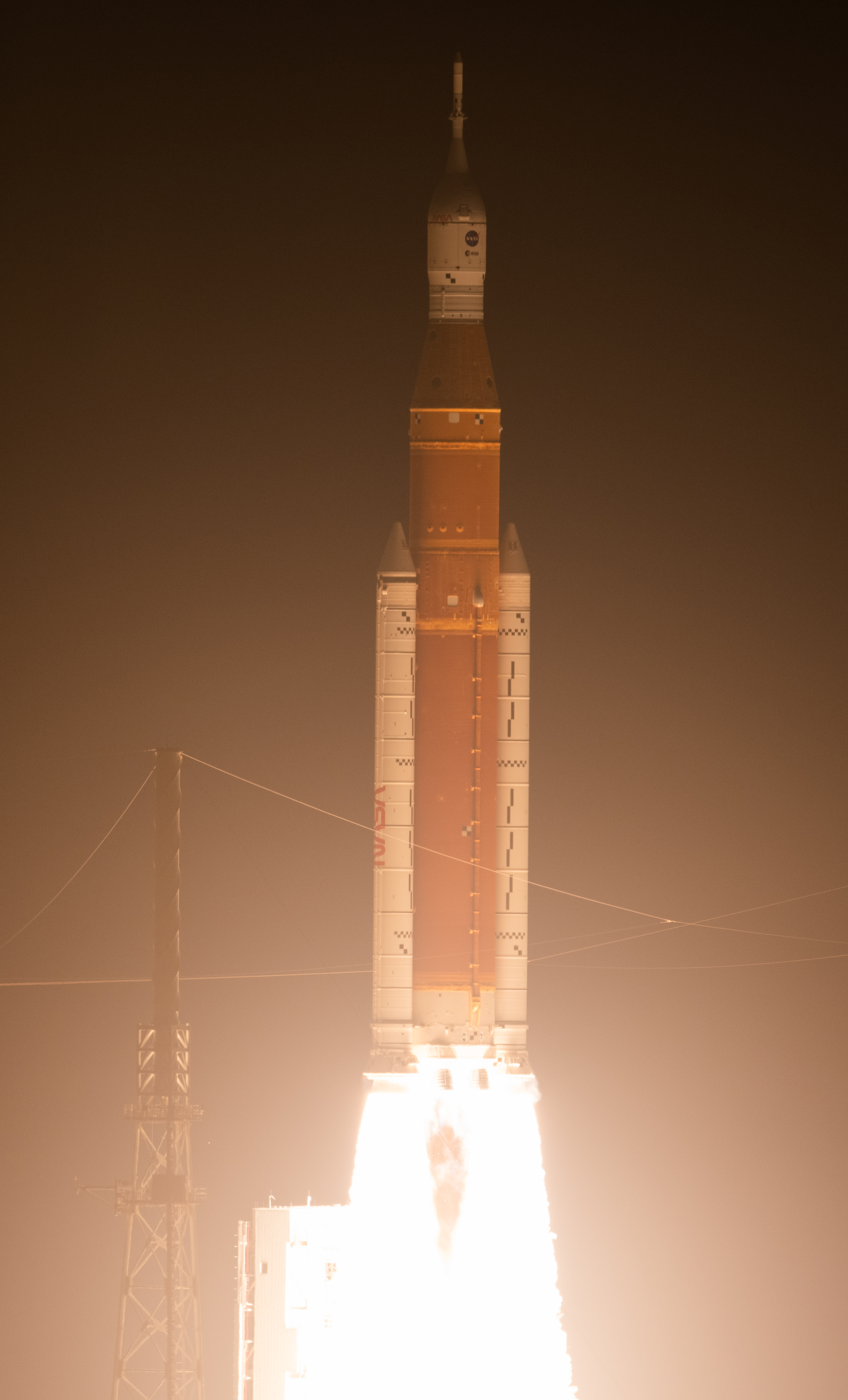
Artemis 1 mission

The NASA Authorization Act of 2010 required a new heavy–lift vehicle design to be chosen within 90 days of its passing. The authorization act called this new HLV the Space Launch System (SLS). The Orion spacecraft was left virtually unchanged from its previous design. The Space Launch System will launch both Orion and other necessary hardware. The SLS is to be upgraded over time with more powerful versions. The initial version of SLS will be capable of lifting 70 tonnes into low Earth orbit. It is then planned to be upgraded in various ways to lift 105 tonnes, and then, eventually, 130 tonnes.

Exploration Flight Test 1 (EFT-1), an uncrewed test flight of Orion's crew module, launched on December 5, 2014, on a Delta IV Heavy rocket.

Artemis I is the first flight of the SLS and was launched in November 2022 as a test of the completed Orion and SLS system. Artemis II, the first crewed mission of the program, launched four astronauts in April, 2026, since all Artemis I flight objectives have been met. The second mission included a free-return flyby of the Moon at a distance of 8,520 kilometers (4,600 nmi). After Artemis II, the Power and Propulsion Element of the Lunar Gateway and three components of an expendable lunar lander are planned to be delivered on multiple launches from commercial launch service providers.

Artemis III is planned to launch in 2027 aboard a SLS Block 1 rocket and will use the minimalist Gateway and expendable lander to achieve the first crewed lunar landing of the program. The flight is planned to touch down on the lunar south pole region, with two astronauts staying there for about one week.

=== ISS crew and cargo resupply ===
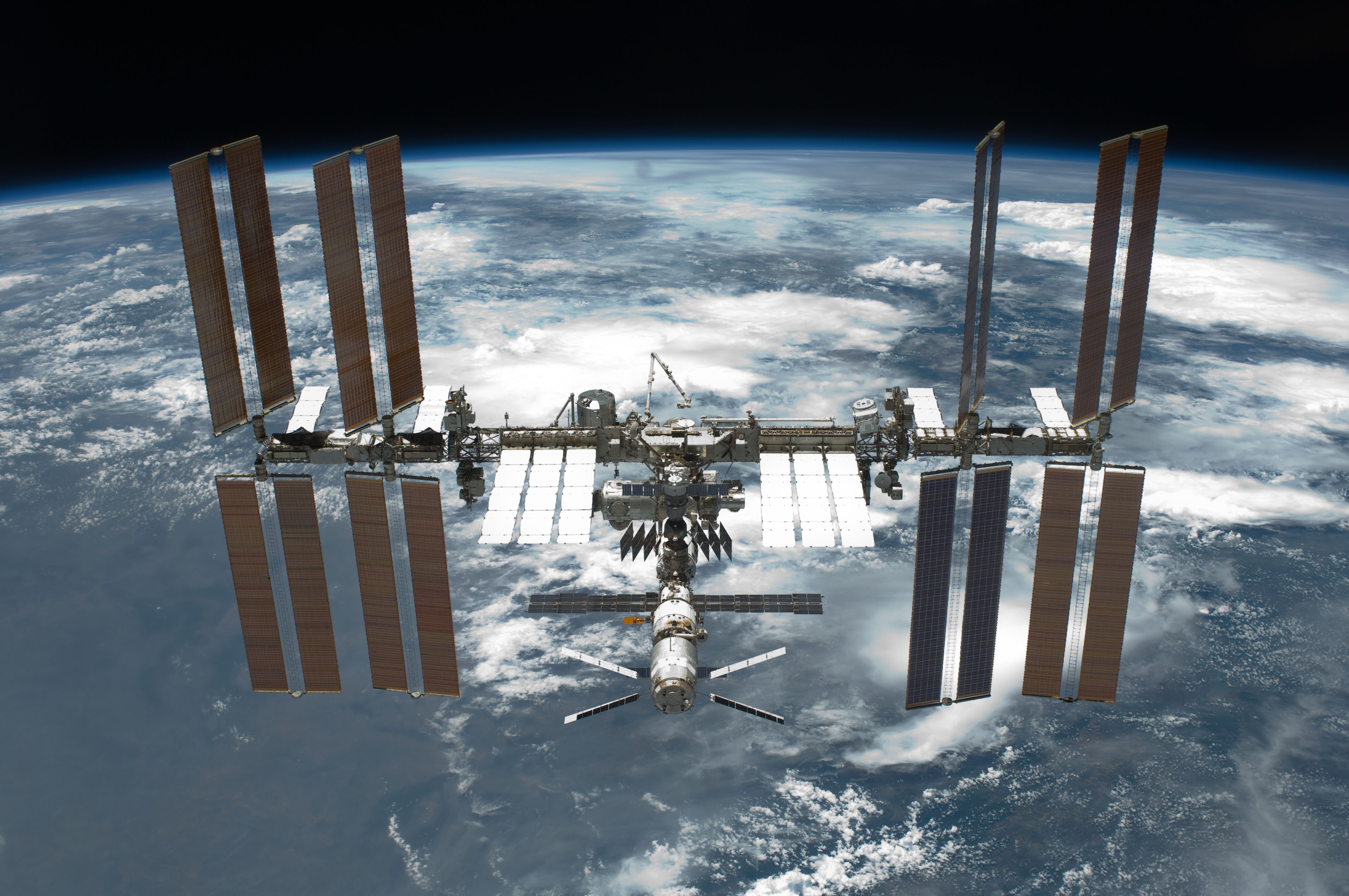
The International Space Station as seen by STS-134

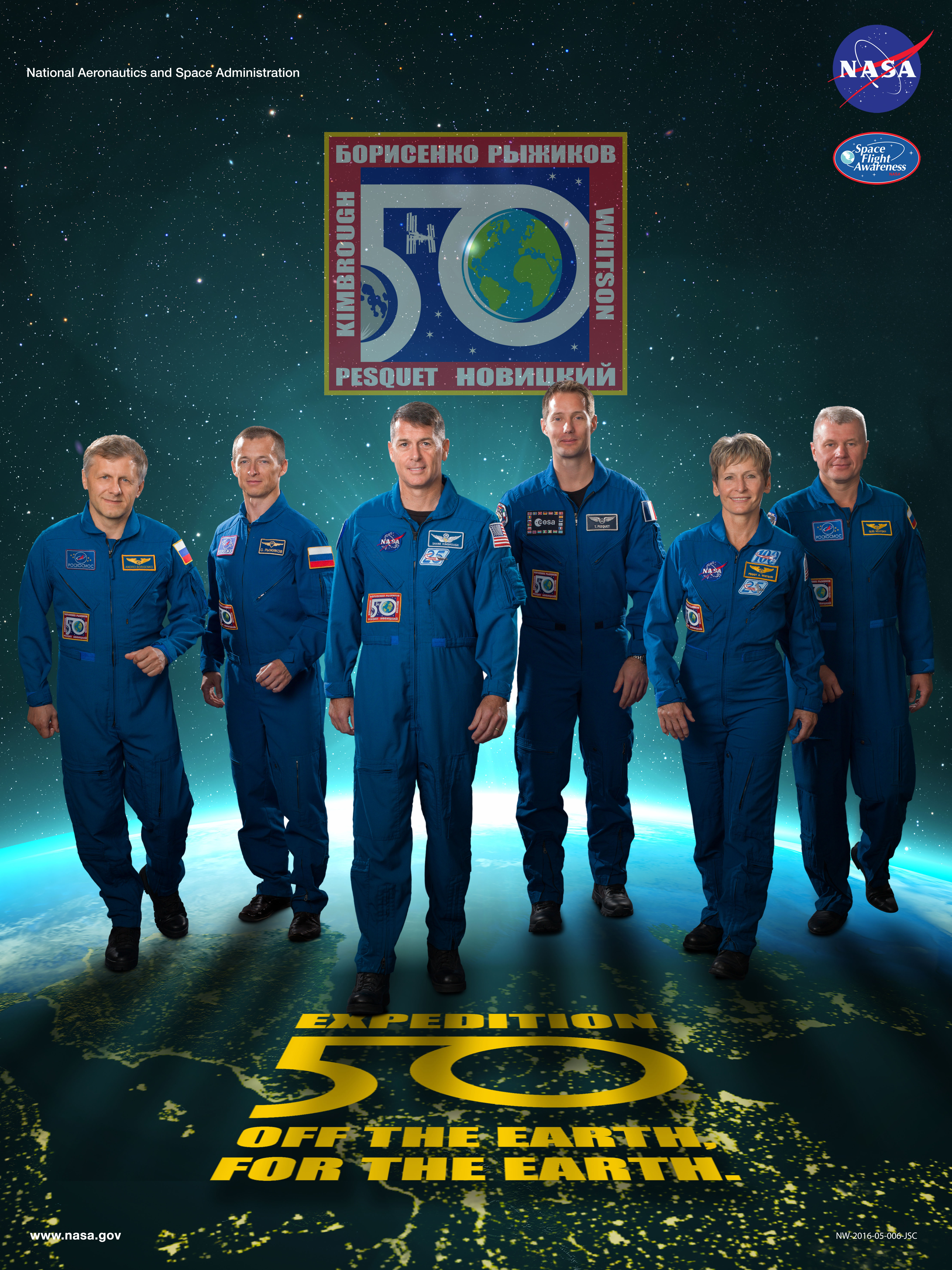
Crew poster for Expedition 50, with text saying "Off the Earth, For the Earth"

The ISS is committed to be funded until at least 2030. Until another U.S. crew vehicle was ready, crews accessed the ISS exclusively aboard the Russian Soyuz spacecraft. The Soyuz was chosen as the ISS lifeboat during the development of the International Space Station, and has been one of the space taxis used by the international participants to this program. A Soyuz took Expedition 1, which included one U.S. astronaut in the year 2000. Previously the United States and Russia had collaborated on extended the Mir space station with the Shuttle-Mir program in the 1990s.

Although the Orion spacecraft is oriented towards deep-space missions such as NEO visitation, it can also be used to retrieve crew or supplies from the ISS if that task is needed. However, the Commercial Crew Program (CCP) produced a functioning crewed space vehicle starting operations in 2020, providing an alternative to Orion or Soyuz. The delay was longer than expected because the Ares I was cancelled in 2010, leaving little time before the STS retired for something new to be ready for flight. U.S. Congress was aware a spaceflight gap could occur and accelerated funding in 2008 and 2009 in preparation for the retirement of the Shuttle. At that time the first crewed flight of the planned Ares I launcher would not have occurred until 2015, and its first use at ISS until 2016. Another option that had been analyzed was to adapt Orion to a human-rated heavy launch vehicle like the Delta IV Heavy. (see also Evolved Expendable Launch Vehicle) Another spacecraft evaluated by NASA, and also for commercial crew, was the OmegA rocket, which would look similar to Ares I and would have been based on the Space Shuttle Solid Rocket Booster.

==== Commercial Resupply Services ====
The Commercial Orbital Transportation Services (COTS) development program began in 2006 with the purpose of creating commercially operated automated cargo spacecraft to service the ISS. The program is a fixed–price milestone-based development program, meaning that each company that received a funded award had to have a list of milestones with a dollar value attached to them that they would not receive until after achieving the milestone. Private companies are also required to have some "skin in the game" which refers to raising additional private investment for their proposal.

On December 23, 2008, NASA awarded Commercial Resupply Services contracts to SpaceX and Orbital Sciences Corporation (with corporate mergers and acquisitions now Northrop Grumman); SpaceX using its Falcon 9 rocket and Dragon spacecraft and Orbital Sciences (now Northrop Grumman) using its Antares rocket and Cygnus spacecraft. The first Dragon resupply mission occurred in May 2012. The first Cygnus resupply mission completed on 23 Oct 2013 after a flight that included remaining attached to the ISS for 23 days. The CRS program provides for all the projected U.S. cargo-transportation needs to the ISS, with the exception of a few vehicle–specific payloads to be delivered on the European ATV and the Japanese HTV.

==== Commercial Crew Program ====
The Commercial Crew Program (CCP) was initiated in 2010 with the purpose of creating commercially operated crew vehicles capable of delivering at least four astronauts to the ISS, staying docked for 180 days and then returning them to Earth. Like COTS, CCP is a fixed–price milestone-based developmental program that requires some private investment.

In the first phase of the program, NASA provided a total of $50 million divided among five U.S. companies, intended to foster research and development into human spaceflight concepts and technologies in the private sector. In 2011, during the second phase of the program, NASA provided $270 million divided among four companies. During the third phase of the program, NASA provided $1.1 billion divided among three companies. This phase of the CCP was expected to last from June 3, 2012, to May 31, 2014. The winners of that round were SpaceX Dragon 2 (derived from the Dragon cargo vehicle), Boeing's CST-100 and Sierra Nevada's Dream Chaser. The United Launch Alliance worked on human-rating their Atlas V rocket as part of the latter two proposals. Ultimately NASA selected the Crew Dragon and CST-100 Starliner with the Dream Chaser only receiving a cargo contract. The Crew Dragon began delivering crew in 2020, with the CST-100, who began delivering crew in 2024.

On May 30, 2020, SpaceX launched Crew Dragon on the Crew Dragon Demo-2 mission to the International Space Station. It carried a crew of two NASA astronauts, Doug Hurley and Bob Behnken, for a 62-day mission, which was incorporated as part of Expedition 63. This was the first crewed launch of a US-built capsule since the Apollo-Soyuz Test project on July 15, 1975. Hurley, who was the pilot for Atlantis on the final Shuttle mission, STS-135, commanded the Demo-2 mission. Operational use of the Crew Dragon began with the launch of SpaceX Crew-1, carrying four astronauts, on November 16, 2020. The crew joined Expedition 64. Of the crew, only Japanese astronaut Soichi Noguchi had previously flown on the Space Shuttle.

On the other hand, on June 5, 2024, Boeing launched Starliner on the CFT mission to the International Space Station. It carried a crew of two NASA astronauts, Barry E. Wilmore and Sunita Williams, for a 8-day short mission, albeit extended to more than a month in length due to propulsion issues. Wilmore, who was the pilot for Atlantis on the 129th Shuttle mission, STS-129, commanded the CFT mission.

== Gallery ==
Space Shuttles in Retirement
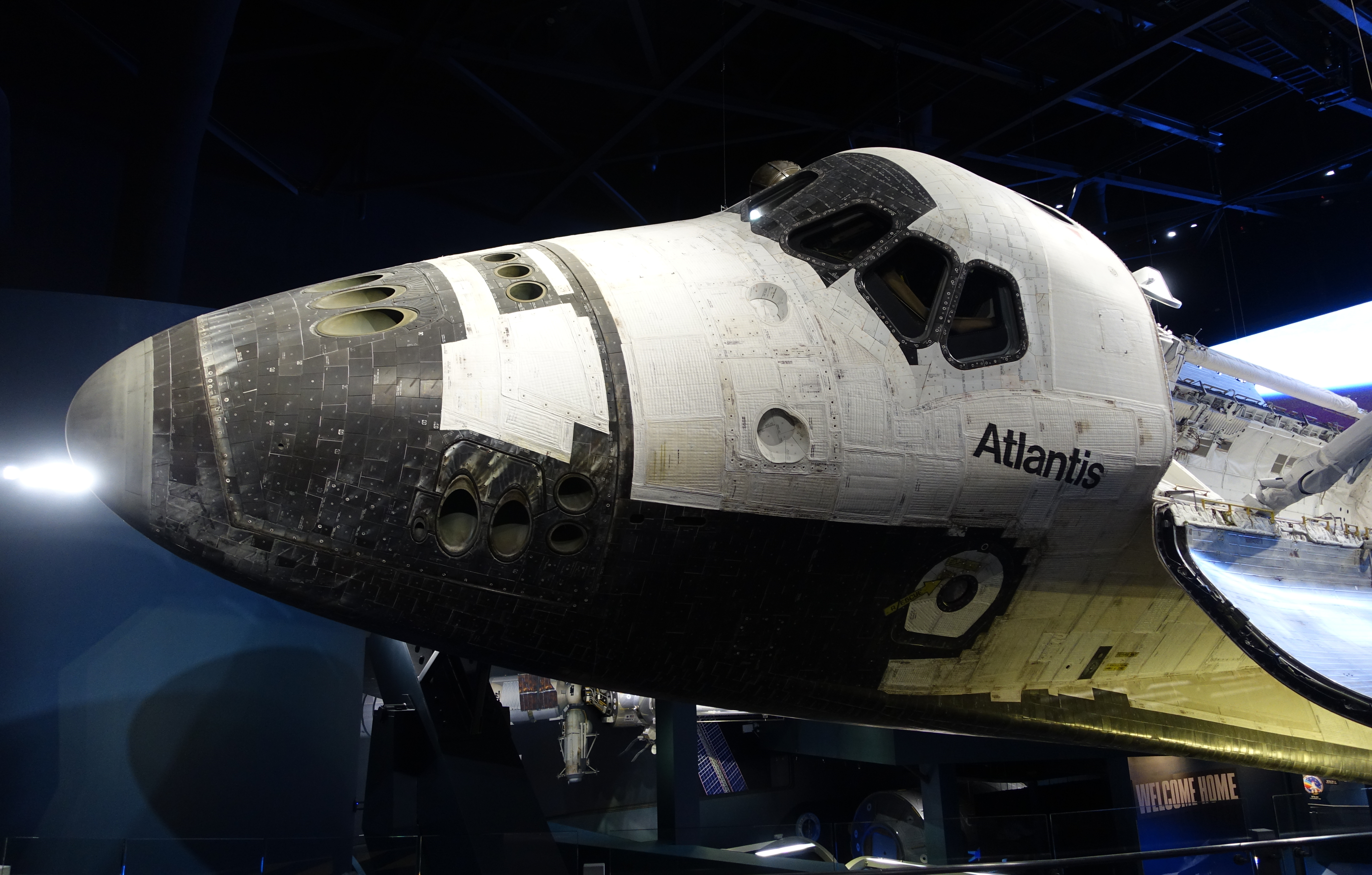
Atlantis at Kennedy Space Center Visitor Center

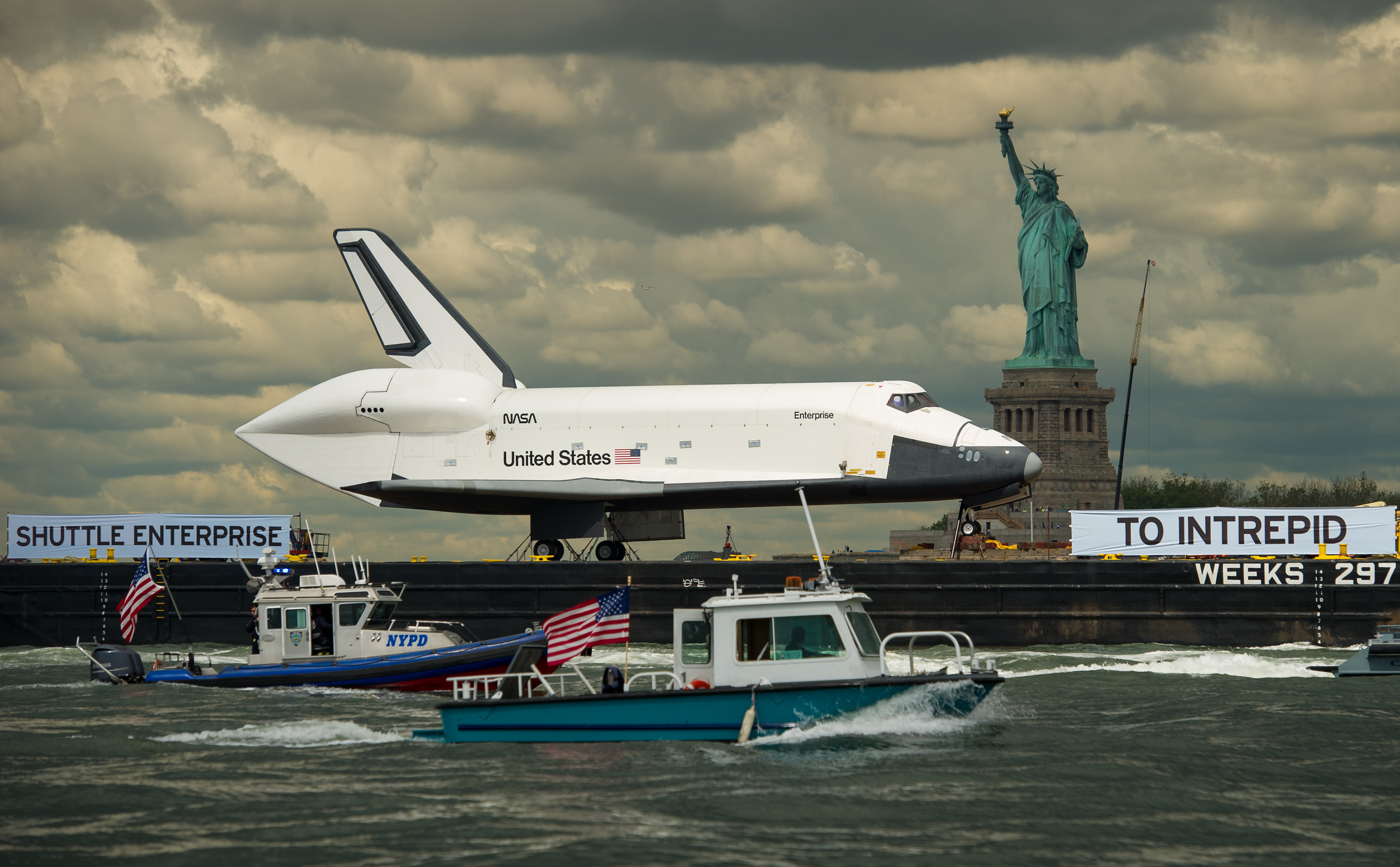
Enterprise moving up the Hudson River to the Intrepid Museum

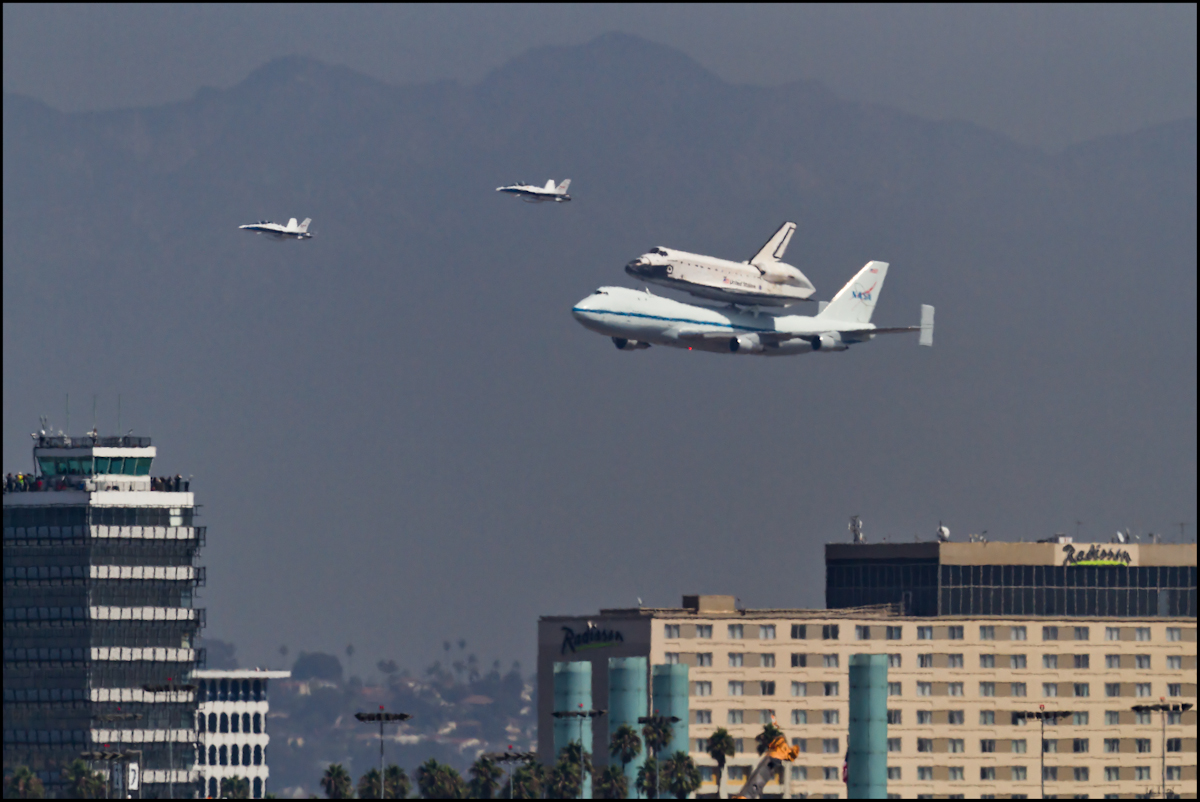
Endeavour arriving in Los Angeles (LAX)

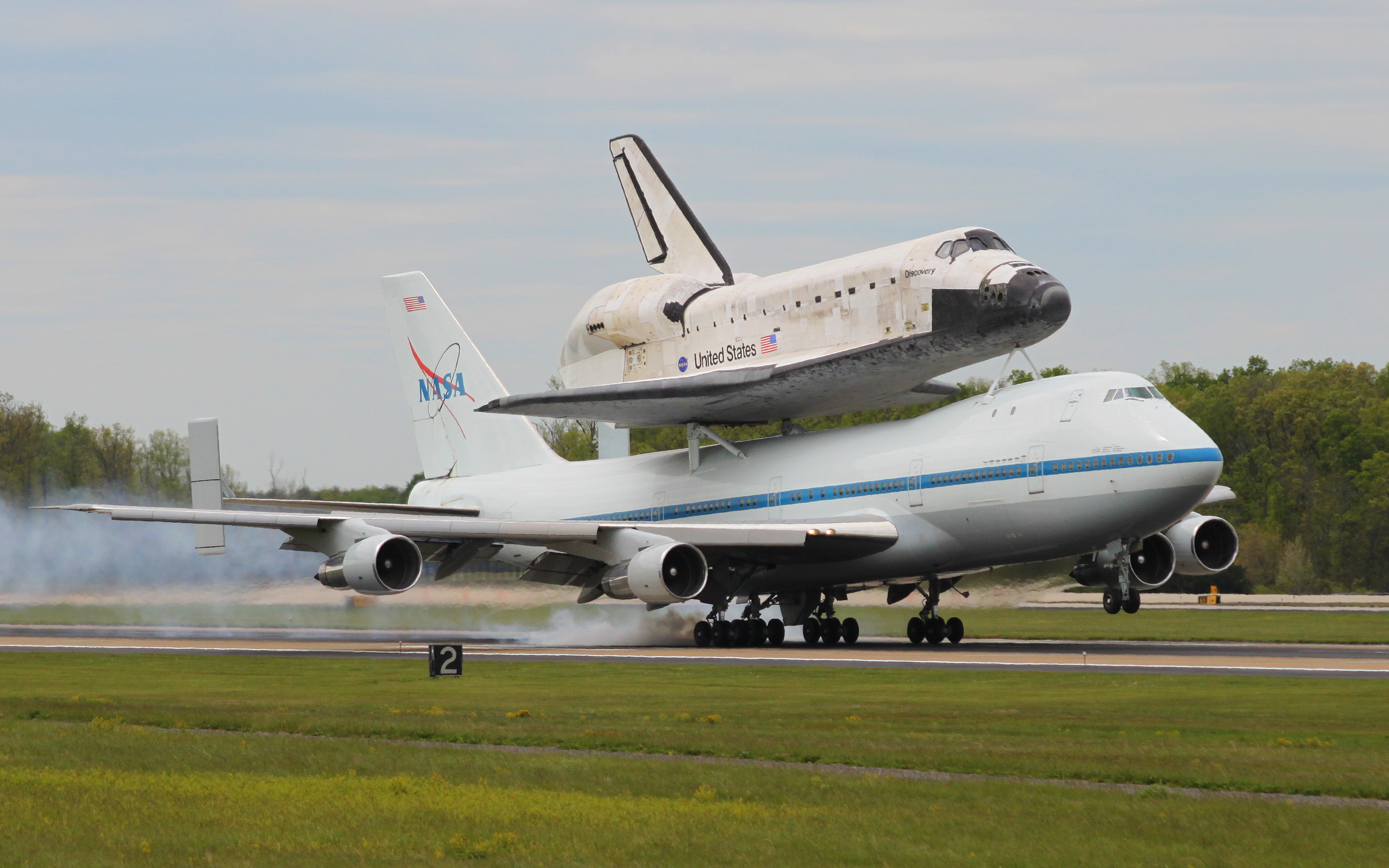
Discovery arriving at Washington Dulles

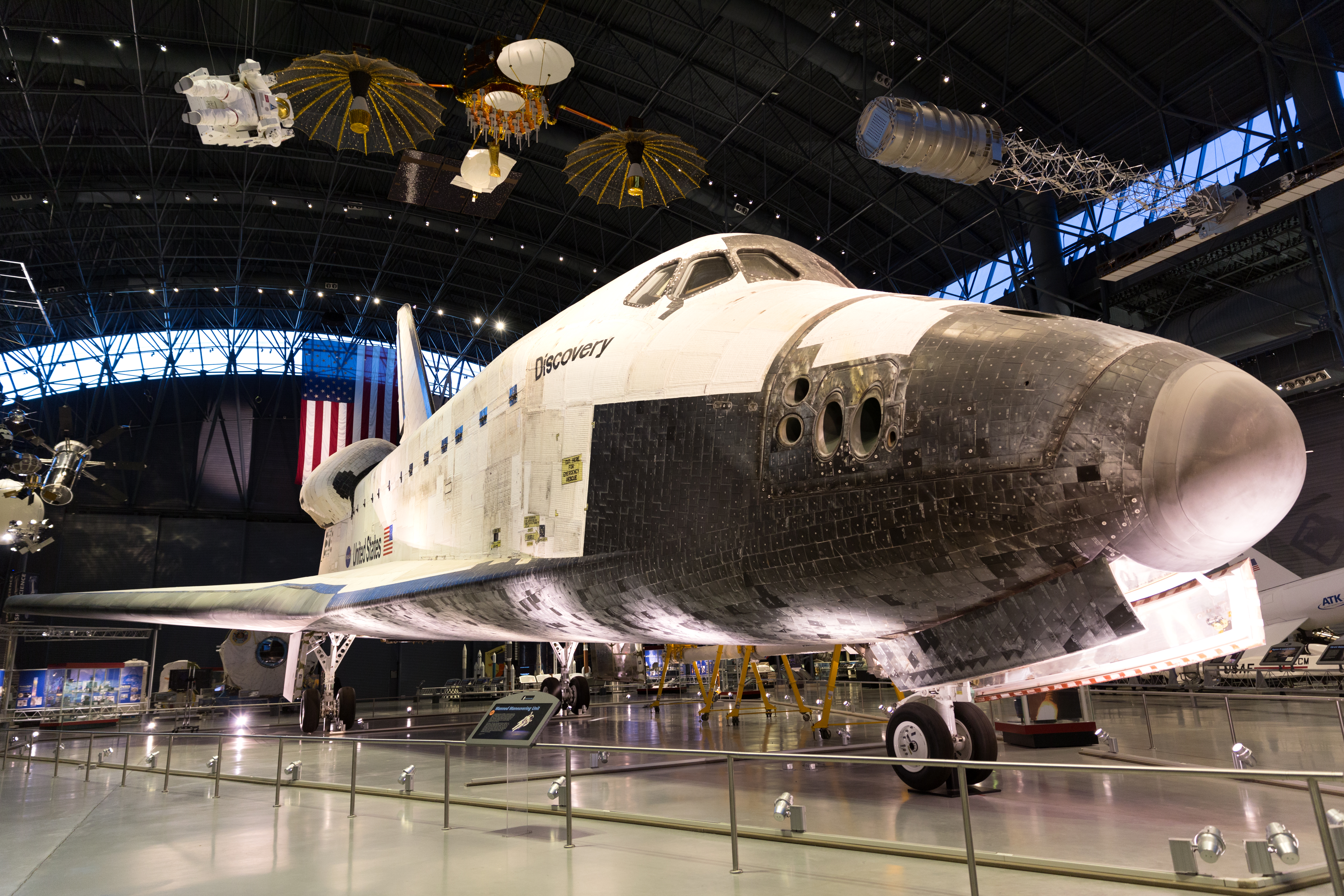
Discovery on display at Udvar-Hazy Center in Virginia

== See also ==
- Commercial Crew Development
- Criticism of the Space Shuttle program
- List of Russian human spaceflight missions
