= Liberty (rocket) =

Launch vehicle design

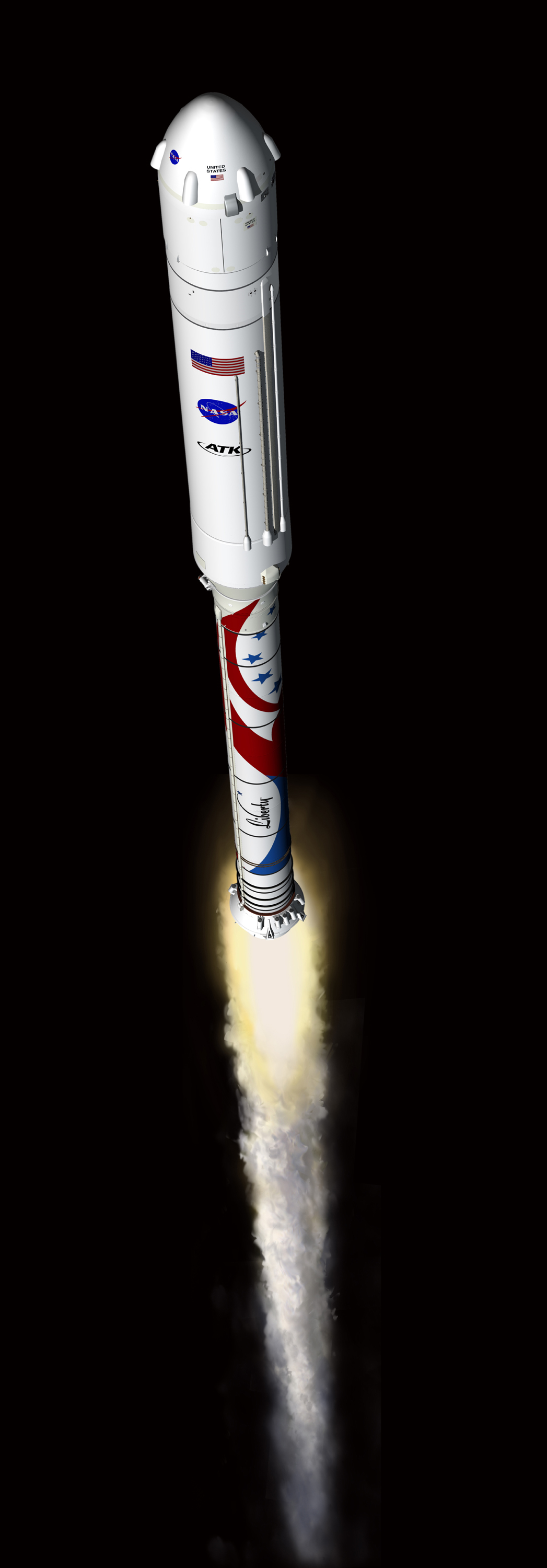
- Artist's conception
- Manufacturer: Northrop Grumman Space Systems; Airbus Defence and Space
- Country of origin: United States; Europe

Size
- Height: 300 ft (90.00 m)
- Diameter: 18 ft (5.40 m)
- Stages: 2

Capacity

Payload to LEO
- Mass: 44,500 lb (20,000 kg)

Associated rockets
- Family: Preceded by Ares I Followed by OmegA

First stage
- Powered by: 5-segment Shuttle-derived Solid Rocket Booster
- Propellant: Solid

Second stage
- Powered by: 1 × Vulcain 2
- Maximum thrust: 301243 pounds (1,340 kN)
- Specific impulse: 431 seconds (vacuum)
- Burn time: 650 seconds
- Propellant: LOX/LH2

The Liberty Logo

Liberty was a 2011 launch vehicle concept proposed by ATK (now part of Northrop Grumman Space Systems via the acquisition of Orbital ATK) and Airbus Defence and Space (formerly Astrium) for phase 2 of the NASA Commercial Crew Development (CCDev) program intended to stimulate development of privately operated crew vehicles to low Earth orbit.

Similar to the defunct Ares I project, which consisted of a five segment Space Shuttle Solid Rocket Booster (SRB) and a new cryogenic second stage, Liberty would combine a five-segment SRB with the core stage of the European Ariane 5 as a second stage. It was intended to be launched from Kennedy Space Center.

Liberty was proposed as a vehicle to service the International Space Station for crew and cargo, but its capacities could potentially have allowed for government and commercial satellite launches, including to Geostationary transfer orbit.

The launcher was proposed to be 300 feet (91 m) in height, with an advertised price of $180 million per launch. Liberty had a projected payload of 44,500 lb (20,000 kg) to Low Earth orbit.

== History ==
The ATK/Astrium Liberty proposal was not initially selected by NASA in the 2011 contract awards to assist development of a commercial space transportation system to replace the Space Shuttle; however, the team continued development in the hope of gaining funding from NASA in future years. On September 13, 2011, NASA and ATK held a joint news conference to announce they had signed an unfunded Space Act Agreement (SAA) to collaborate on the development of the Liberty Transportation System as part of the agency's Commercial Crew Development Round 2 activities. NASA suggested this agreement could "accelerate the availability of U.S. commercial crew transportation capabilities."

In January 2012 NASA's Commercial Crew office announced ATK had successfully held a Launch System Initial Systems Design (ISD) Review of the Liberty Transportation System, the third of five milestones to be completed under the SAA. The current SAA continued through at least March 2012.

Liberty was not among the vehicles selected for funding announced on August 3, 2012, under the Commercial Crew Integrated Capacity program. ATK's stated goal prior to the CCiCAP award announcement was to begin test launches in 2015, with a crewed flight in 2016. In early August 2012, shortly before NASA announced the selectees for CCDev award, ATK Liberty manager Kent Rominger stated that the program would continue even without CCiCAP funding. However, following the NASA decision not to select Liberty as a design for further government funding, ATK president and CEO Mark DeYoung stated that the company was "'moving on' after the failure to win a NASA contract reassessing their plans and the decision would not cause any financial hardship."

== Liberty spacecraft ==
In May 2012 ATK announced that Liberty would indeed be a complete commercial crew transportation system, including the spacecraft, abort system, launch vehicle, and ground and mission operations. The spacecraft was to be narrowly derived from concepts generated during the Orion program, and make use of the Orion Service Module. ATK projected that the first launch could have taken place as early as 2013, with astronauts launching by 2015.

The spacecraft would be made of ATK's composite space shell developed as an alternative to the Orion's aluminum lithium structure. It would carry up to 7 crew members to and from the ISS or other space stations and was designed with commercial customers in mind. Some designs had an integrated unpressurized storage bay in between the crew module and service module that allowed the spacecraft to carry 5000 pounds of cargo in a pressurized container. This cargo would be berthed to the station by the Canadarm 2. It could also carry up to four unpressurized science pallets to be attached to the station by crew members on EVA or the Canadarm 2. The vehicle would rely on an ATK Max Launch Abort System designed for the Orion spacecraft. The spacecraft would be able to launch both crew and cargo like the Shuttle although it would not be able to return said cargo.

== See also ==
- Ares I, a proposed Constellation program rocket based on an SDLV SRB-derived first stage and a Saturn V-derived J-2X second stage
- OmegA, ATK's proposed new rocket based on SDLV SRB-derived first and second stages and Aerojet Rocketdyne RL10 third stage
