= Brazos Valley Museum of Natural History =

Science museum in Bryan, Texas

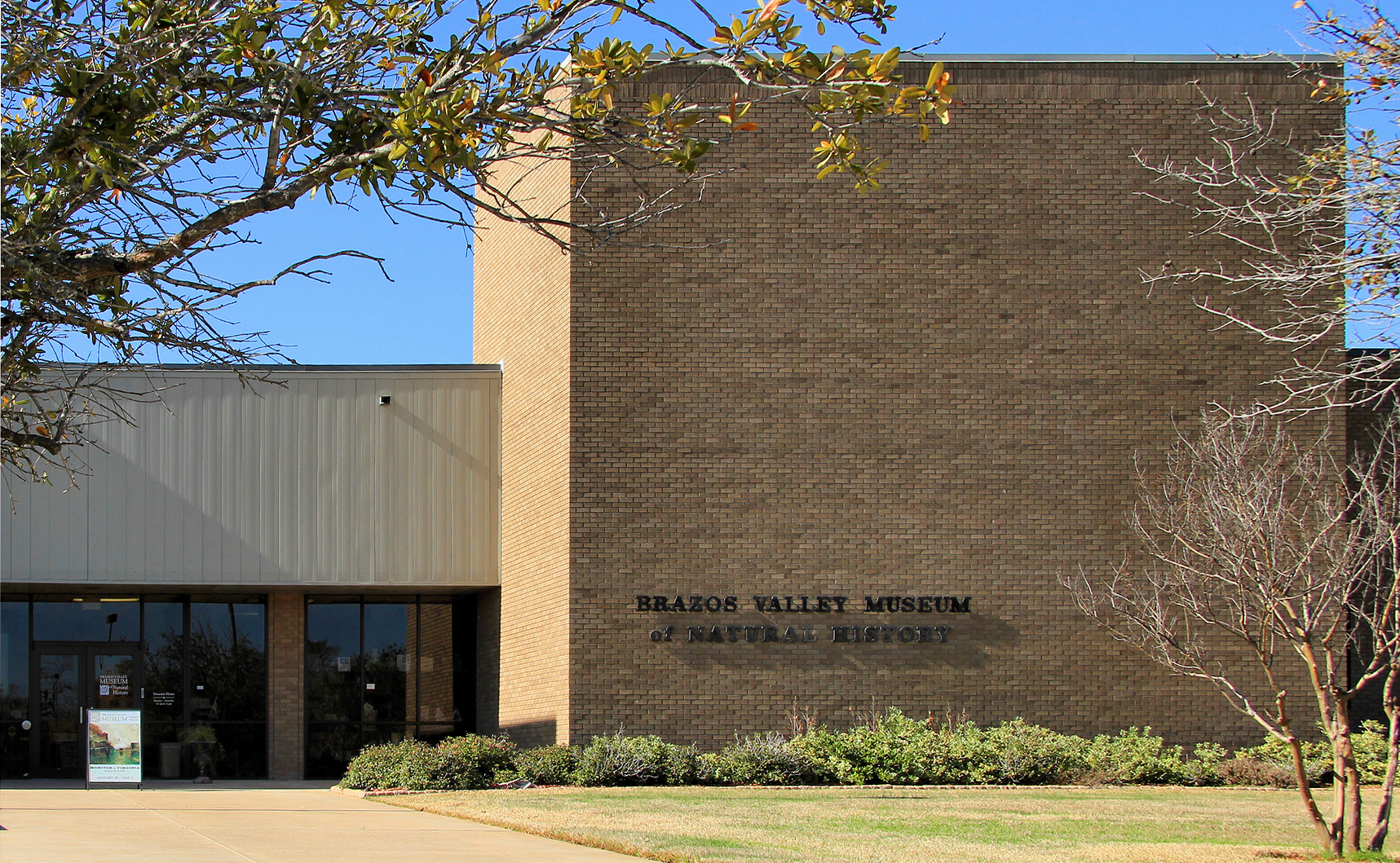
- Established: 1961
- Location: Bryan, Texas
- Coordinates: 30.6668°N 96.3209°W
- Director: Dr. Deborah Cowman
- Website: Brazos Valley Museum of Natural History

The Brazos Valley Museum of Natural History is a science, nature, and cultural history museum in Bryan, Texas, United States. The museum also maintains memberships in American Alliance of Museums, Natural Science Collections Alliance, and the Society for the Preservation of Natural History Collections.

The Brazos Valley Museum of Natural History maintains collections in the fields of archaeology, botany, conchology, cultural history, geology, mammalogy, ornithology, and paleontology.

The museum was among 14 to be considered to display one of the four space shuttle orbiters made available by NASA at the end of the space shuttle program to its new Museum of Science and History Former president George H. W. Bush, whose presidential library is several miles from the museum, has expressed his support. Museum officials were initially very positive about their chances of being selected, with the museum executive directory saying, "I definitely think that we are going to get one of the shuttles." The museum was not selected to receive an orbiter, finishing last in scoring, with the NASA selection community citing significant concerns about the museum's attendance levels and risks to the orbiter in transportation to the museum. Nearby Texas A&M University was selected to receive a full motion shuttle simulator used by astronauts in training.

The Frithiof Fossil Collection includes a 15-inch Paleozoic trilobite and complete skeletons of an Ice Age cave bear, early wolf, Saber-toothed cat, along with numerous other partial skeletons. Dinosaurs are represented by the skull, vertebrae, femur, arm, an enormous tail of a hadrosaurid dinosaur, teeth and various bones of a Tyrannosaurus rex and Albertosaurus, and parts of a gigantic Camarasaurus, Triceratops, and Maiasaura. The hadrosaurid tail is unique in that it is one of the few fossils with fossilized skin.

The Museum houses the complete skeletons of Psittacosaurus, an early ancestor of Triceratops, and a complete Confuciusornis, a relative of both the raptor-like dinosaurs and modern birds. Rare, virtually complete skeletons of early mammals, fish, and reptiles are also available for viewing.
