= Omega (rocket) =

Canceled US launch vehicle

- Manufacturer: Orbital ATK (2016–2018); Northrop Grumman (2018–2020)
- Country of origin: United States

Size
- Height: 59.84 m (196.3 ft)
- Diameter: 3.71 m (12.2 ft) first stage 5.25 m (17.2 ft) upper stage
- Stages: 3

Capacity

Payload to GTO
- Mass: Intermediate: 4,900 kg (10,800 lb) to 10,100 kg (22,300 lb)

Payload to GEO
- Mass: Heavy: 5,250 kg (11,570 lb) to 7,800 kg (17,200 lb)

Associated rockets
- Comparable: Ariane 6; Delta IV Heavy; Long March 5; Saturn C-3; Vulcan Centaur; Atlas V; Falcon Heavy; Falcon 9

Launch history
- Status: Cancelled (2020)
- Launch sites: Kennedy, LC-39B; Vandenberg, SLC-6

Boosters – GEM-63XLT
- No. boosters: 2 to 6
- Diameter: 1.6 m (63 in)
- Specific impulse: 279.3 s (2.739 km/s)
- Propellant: AP / HTPB / Al

First stage
- Powered by: Castor 600 (Intermediate) or Castor 1200 (Heavy)
- Propellant: HTPB / AP

Second stage
- Powered by: Castor 300
- Propellant: HTPB / AP

Third stage
- Powered by: 2 × RL-10C-5-1
- Maximum thrust: 101.8 kN (22,890 lbf)
- Specific impulse: ≈450 seconds (vacuum)
- Propellant: LH_{2} / LOX

Omega (stylized as OmegA) was a medium-lift to heavy-lift launch vehicle concept that spent several years in development by Northrop Grumman during 2016–2020, with that development substantially funded by the U.S. government. Omega was intended for launching U.S. national security satellites, as part of the U.S. Department of the Air Force National Security Space Launch (NSSL) replacement program.

The Omega design consisted of new composite solid rocket stages with a cryogenic upper stage provided by Aerojet Rocketdyne, replacing earlier plans to use an upper stage engine provided by Blue Origin. The Omega design was similar to the defunct Ares I and Liberty projects, both of which consisted of a five segment Space Shuttle Solid Rocket Booster (SRB) and a cryogenic second stage. It was intended to be launched from Kennedy Space Center LC-39B or Vandenberg Air Force Base SLC-6.

Omega was proposed as a vehicle to launch national security satellites for the United States Space Force and other government agencies, including to geostationary transfer orbit. The launch vehicle could theoretically launch commercial payloads as well, but was not designed at a price point to make private competitive launches likely. Orbital ATK claimed in 2016 that crewed spacecraft could also be launched, just as the predecessor Ares I and Liberty rockets, which were designed to be able to also launch the Orion space capsule.

By 2016, actual development was to get underway only once the Air Force reached a funding decision. In October 2018, the Air Force announced that Northrop Grumman was awarded $792 million for initial development of the Omega launch vehicle.

== Cancellation ==
In August 2020, the Department of the Air Force announced the results of the approximately US$3.5 billion National Security Space Launch Phase 2, Launch Service Procurement for launches in the 2022–2027 timeframe and Omega was not selected. The USAF announced that it would wind down any remaining Omega development contracts from phase 1, and may not pay out the entire maximum amount of the earlier 2019 contract to NGIS. On 9 September 2020, Northrop Grumman Space Systems released a statement announcing the cancellation of the Omega launch vehicle program.

== History ==
The company that was to propose the Omega launch vehicle in 2016, Orbital ATK (which was subsequently acquired by Northrop Grumman in 2018), through its predecessor company Alliant Techsystems (ATK), had developed the solid rocket boosters for the Space Shuttle in the 1970s–1980s, and military Intercontinental ballistic missiles (ICBMs) prior to that. With the 2004 announcement of the retirement of the Space Shuttle, the company was active in trying to find government purchasers of its, now, 30+ year old solid-propellant rocket technology to continue using the technology for orbital launch vehicles.

From 2004 through 2020, they continued to approach both the US government's civil space agency, NASA, and its military with proposals to develop continued government-funded opportunities to design, build, and support the orbital space application of solid rocket technology. They were successful, as NASA selected ATK's technology for the Ares I crewed launch vehicle in 2005, with ATK supplying a five-segment solid rocket booster as the first stage while also being the primary contractor for the Crew Launch Vehicle (CLV), which was to have a more standard liquid-propellant powered upper stage. In January 2016 they were successful again when Orbital ATK was one of two companies awarded funds by the United States Air Force to develop technologies to eliminate dependency on the Russian-made RD-180 rocket engine for U.S. national security payloads. The award was worth an initial US$46.9 million, with an option for up to US$180.2 million total. This was to be matched by US$31.1 million initially, and up to US$124.8 million in company funds if all options of the contract are exercised. The contract would fund the development of three technologies in support of the Omega rocket, then called Next Generation Launcher: the GEM-63XL strap-on booster, a Common Booster Core, and an extendable nozzle for the BE-3U upper stage engine. A previous effort, funded by NASA, demonstrated the technology for a composite motor case to replace the metal motor cases used for Space Shuttle SRBs.

In May 2016, Orbital ATK revealed their plans for the Next Generation Launcher, including the configuration and the intended business case. The Next Generation Launcher intends to make use of existing launch infrastructure at Kennedy Space Center (KSC), including the Vehicle Assembly Building used by the Space Shuttle, with the possibility of polar orbit launches occurring from Vandenberg Air Force Base. NASA began looking for commercial users to operate unused space within the Vehicle Assembly Building in June 2015, and by April 2016, it was announced that Orbital ATK was in negotiations to lease High Bay 2. Orbital ATK claimed that a minimum of 5–6 launches per year would be required to make the rocket profitable. Full development and introduction will be dependent on both demand and funding from the U.S. Air Force. A final "go/no-go decision" to proceed with full development and introduction of the Next Generation Launcher took place in early 2018.

In April 2017, Orbital ATK revealed that Omega would be launched from pad 39B at KSC, sharing launch facilities and mobile transporter with the NASA Space Launch System (SLS). The rocket would compete for USAF national security launches and NASA missions. There would be multiple configurations of the launch system, with multiple stages.

In April 2018, Orbital ATK announced that Next Generation Launcher would be named Omega. Additionally, they revealed the selection of the RL-10C engine over Blue Origin's BE-3U competitor. The intermediate configuration, with a Castor 600 first stage, increased payload to GTO from 8,500 kilograms (18,700 lb) to 10,100 kilograms (22,300 lb). The Castor 1200-powered Heavy configuration increased GEO payload from 7,000 kilograms (15,000 lb) to 7,800 kilograms (17,200 lb) and has a TLI capability of up to 12,300 kg (27,000 lb).

Orbital ATK was purchased by Northrop Grumman in 2018, and Omega became a Northrop Grumman product.

In October 2018, Omega was awarded a Launch Services Agreement worth US$791,601,015 to design, build and launch the first Omega rockets.

In late May 2019, while conducting a static fire test of the first stage SRB, an anomaly occurred resulting in the destruction of the SRB nozzle (but not the stage itself). A thorough investigation revealed that the differential pressure between the nozzle's internal pressure and surface pressure following the static fire test was greater than expected; when thrust levels dropped below a critical point upon completion of the static fire, the outside air crushed the nozzle "in an instant, just like a soda can".

In 2019, Northrop Grumman bid the Omega launch vehicle to the US Air Force for the multi-year block buy launch contract that would cover all US national security launches in 2022–2026.

On 7 August 2020, the US Department of the Air Force announced the results of the approximately US3.5 billion National Security Space Launch Phase 2 Launch Service Procurement, selecting only SpaceX and United Launch Alliance (ULA) to supply launches to the US Department of Defense in the 2022–2027 timeframe. NGIS Omega was not selected. The Air Force said they would wind down any remaining Omega development contracts from phase 1, and not pay out the entire maximum amount of the earlier 2019 contract to NGIS. The Air Force stated that they would work with NGSS "to determine the right point to tie off their work under the LSA agreements. ... The goal is not to carry them indefinitely, the point of an LSA was to create a more competitive environment".

NGSS indicated they were "disappointed by the decision", and on 9 September 2020 they released a statement announcing the cancellation of the Omega launch vehicle program as NGSS depended on the funding from the US military to develop the vehicle.

== Description ==
The Omega launch vehicle concept is a three-stage-to-orbit launch vehicle originally proposed by Orbital ATK (subsequently Northrop Grumman after the 2018 acquisition of Orbital ATK) that principally uses three different solid-propellant rockets to get to orbit, along with a hydrolox upper stage.

The Omega design was 59.84 m (196.3 ft) with a 3.71 m (12.2 ft)-diameter first and second stages and a 5.25 m (17.2 ft)-diameter upper stage. There were intended to be two version of the main rocket stack, plus variable 2 to 6 SRBs attached to the first stage to assist with the entire variety of NSSL reference orbits.

The design payload for the primary DoD missions that it was being aimed at was 4,900 kg (10,800 lb) to 10,100 kg (22,300 lb) to GTO with the "Intermediate" version and 5,250 kg (11,570 lb) to 7,800 kg (17,200 lb) to GEO with the "Heavy" version.

=== Multiple configurations ===
The rocket was to have had two basic configurations, an intermediate and a heavy launch. Both configurations would have had a minimum of two thrust vectoring GEM-63XLTs for roll control. The intermediate version was to have had a two-segment solid rocket booster (SRB) first stage, a single-segment SRB second stage, and a liquid hydrogen-fueled third stage, while the heavy configuration would have a 4-segment SRB first stage and the same upper stages. Additional versions could conceivably have added additional SRBs as side boosters with the SRBs sharing avionics suites with other Orbital ATK rockets to reduce costs.

== See also ==
- Vulcan Centaur
- Falcon 9
- Delta IV
- Ares I and Liberty, similar proposals of space rockets based on the Space Shuttle SRB
