= List of Space Launch System launches =

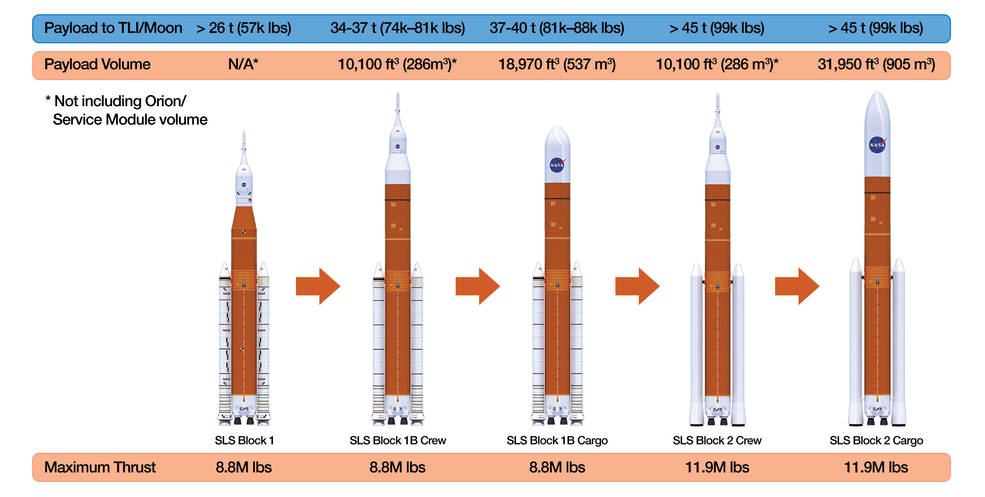
Configurations of the Space Launch System – Block 1 with the ICPS, Block 1B with the EUS, and Block 2 with upgraded boosters and larger payload fairing.

As of April 2026, the Space Launch System (SLS) – a Shuttle-derived, super heavy-lift expendable launch vehicle – has conducted two successful launches, and a further three have been officially scheduled. All flights on the current launch manifest are for the Artemis program, a human spaceflight project aimed at establishing a permanent human presence on the Moon. The flights launch from the vehicle's dedicated pad at Kennedy Space Center's Launch Complex 39B (LC-39B). The first three flights use the Block 1 configuration with a modified Delta Cryogenic Second Stage known as the Interim Cryogenic Propulsion Stage (ICPS). Originally, the Block 1B configuration with the Exploration Upper Stage (EUS) was planned to be used starting from the fourth flight, but the Centaur V will now be used instead for a standardized SLS configuration.

== Launches ==
Flight No.	Date, time (UTC)	Mission	Orbit	Outcome
1	November 16, 2022, 06:47	Artemis I	Selenocentric (DRO)	Success
1	Uncrewed maiden flight of the SLS, first operational flight of the Orion spacecraft and European Service Module. Carrying cubesats for ten missions in the CubeSat Launch Initiative (CSLI), and three missions in the Cube Quest Challenge: ArgoMoon, BioSentinel, CuSP, EQUULEUS, LunaH-Map, Lunar IceCube, LunIR, NEA Scout, OMOTENASHI and Team Miles. The payloads were sent on a trans-lunar injection trajectory.			
2	April 1, 2026, 22:35	Artemis II	Circumlunar (fly-by)	Success
2	First crewed lunar mission since Apollo 17 in 1972. Conducted a flyby of the Moon, breaking the record for the furthest human distance from Earth. Carried four CSLI payloads: TACHELES, ATENEA, K-RadCube, and SHAMS.			
3	Late 2027	Artemis III	LEO	Planned
3	Crewed rendezvous and docking tests with one or both lunar landers launched separately—SpaceX's Starship HLS and Blue Origin's Blue Moon—as well as tests of the Exploration Extravehicular Mobility Unit (xEMU) space suit. Will fly without an upper stage.			
4	Early 2028	Artemis IV	Selenocentric	Planned
4	First crewed lunar landing mission since Apollo 17.			
5	Late 2028	Artemis V	Selenocentric	Planned
5	Second planned crewed lunar landing mission. Initial construction of Moon base to begin. Expected to be first use of Centaur V upper stage with SLS.			

== Proposed launches ==
=== Later Artemis missions ===
In early 2019, then-Associate Administrator for Human Exploration William H. Gerstenmaier drafted a proposal for three more launches of SLS Block 1B launch vehicles beyond Artemis 5 in support of the Artemis program. These include two crewed launches of the Orion spacecraft.

=== Non-Artemis missions ===
In 2012, Skylab II was proposed by an engineer working with NASA's Marshall Space Flight Center. It would use the EUS hydrogen tank to build a 21st-century version of Skylab.

SLS was considered as a potential launch vehicle for the proposed Large UV Optical Infrared Surveyor (LUVOIR) space telescope, which will have a main segmented mirror between 8 and 16 meters in diameter, making it 300 times more powerful than Hubble Space Telescope. It would be deployed at the Earth-Sun L2 point in 2035.

Proposals by Bigelow Aerospace, Boeing, Lockheed Martin, Orbital ATK, Sierra Nevada Corporation, Space Systems Loral, and Nanoracks to build the Deep Space Habitat – a spacecraft with a large enough living space for humans to travel to destinations such as Mars, near Earth asteroids, or cislunar space – all envisioned a launch aboard an SLS vehicle.

The proposed Europa Lander, formerly part of the Europa Clipper mission, was proposed to be launched aboard an SLS in the mid-2010s. The joint NASA-ESA Titan Saturn System Mission proposal envisioned the SLS as an option for launch. On 10 February 2021, it was announced that Europa Clipper would not launch aboard an SLS. In July 2021, NASA booked a SpaceX Falcon Heavy launch for Europa Clipper at a price of $178 million. In addition to being much cheaper to launch, the Europa Clipper spacecraft would not need expensive structural modification to handle vibrational loads caused by the SLS's solid rocket boosters. The total cost savings was estimated at US$2 billion, but Europa Clipper will need three years longer to reach Jupiter on account of the smaller Falcon Heavy launcher.

The SLS was proposed by Boeing as a launch vehicle for a Uranus probe concept developed by NASA. The rocket would "deliver a small payload into orbit around Uranus and a shallow probe into the planet's atmosphere". The mission would study the Uranian atmosphere, magnetic and thermal characteristics, gravitational harmonics, as well as do flybys of Uranian moons. In addition, a 2017 study suggested that a single SLS Block 1B launch vehicle could launch two spacecraft, one to each ice giant, with launch dates suggested from 2024 to 2037 followed by a four-year transit time. Updated versions of the proposal recommend using a Falcon Heavy instead of SLS.

== See also ==
- List of Atlas launches (2020–2029)
- List of Falcon 9 and Falcon Heavy launches
- List of Thor and Delta launches (2020–2029)
- List of Starship launches
