= Berlin Business Location Center =

Internet business portal

Berlin Business Location Center (BLC)
- Company type: Public Private Partnership
- Founded: 2001
- Headquarters: Berlin, Germany
- Services: Business Location Services: Berlin Economy Overview Map; Real Estate Portal
- Website: www.businesslocationcenter.com

The Berlin Business Location Center (BLC) is an Internet business portal and consultation center serving companies that wish to invest or set up a business in Berlin. The BLC is an information service provided by Berlin's economic development agency. Since 2001, the BLC has been advising investors on how to locate their business in Berlin, while also assisting Berlin-based companies with their foreign-trade activities.

The BLC is headquartered at Ludwig Erhard Haus in Berlin City West. Another consultation office is located at Berlin Brandenburg Airport (BER).

== Structure ==
The BLC is run by Berlin Partner for Business and Technology (BPWT), which was created in 2003 when its two predecessor organizations, Wirtschaftsförderung Berlin International GmbH (WFBI) and the marketing company Partner für Berlin (established in 1994), merged.

The BLC is a public-private partnership entered into by private companies and the Federal Land of Berlin, via its business development agency Berlin Partner for Business and Technology. As of 2012, the project is supported by about 30 private and public institutions. Investitonsbank Berlin (IBB) is the largest shareholder of BPWT and a partner of the BLC.

The BLC is financed mainly through partnership contributions and donations.

== History ==
The BLC was established in 2001 by then-Mayor Eberhard Diepgen and the Senator for Economic Affairs Wolfgang Branoner.

This had been preceded by a 1998 resolution of the Berlin Senate to overhaul the whole range of the city's economic development activities. The objective was to convert the previously heterogeneous organization of Berlin's business promotion into a centralized agency.

In this way, the BLC played a pioneering role in Europe as the first agency providing information to potential investors, not least because Berlin was the only city in Germany that has been mapped in a fully textured 3D format. The virtual presentation of Berlin as a site of business and industry in the 3D city model of Berlin, combined with industry-specific data about Berlin's economy gives potential investors all the information they need and a precise understanding of the location and surroundings of their future address in Berlin.
