= Tacheles (satellite) =

German deep-space cubesat

TACHELES
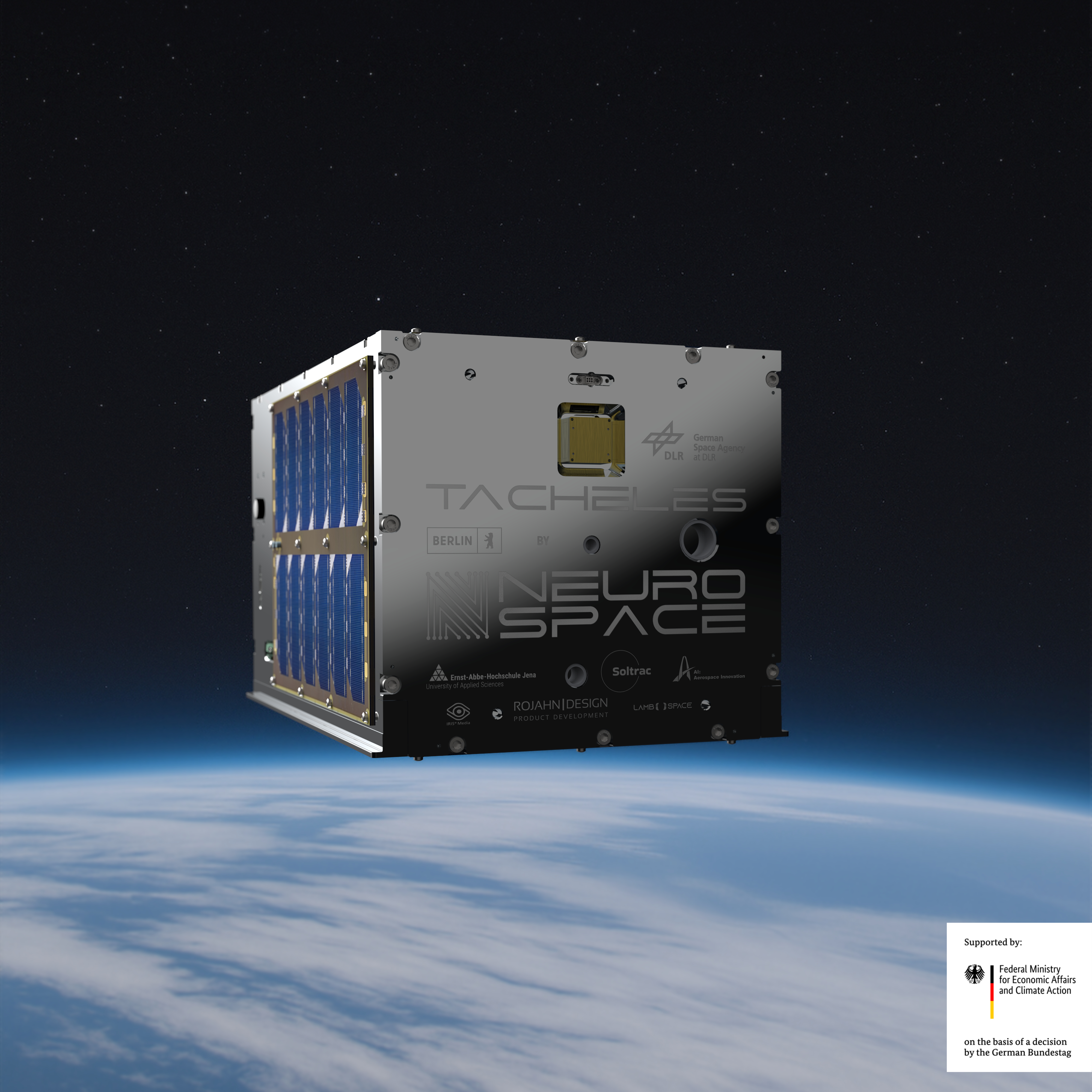
- Operator: Neurospace
- COSPAR ID: 2026-069B
- SATCAT no.: 68539

Spacecraft properties
- Bus: 12U CubeSat
- Manufacturer: Neurospace

Start of mission
- Launch date: April 1, 2026, 22:35:00 UTC (6:24 pm EDT)
- Rocket: Space Launch System (Artemis II)
- Launch site: Kennedy, LC-39B
- Contractor: NASA

Orbital parameters
- Reference system: Geocentric orbit
- Regime: High Earth orbit
- Perigee altitude: 149 km (93 mi)
- Apogee altitude: 70,256 km (43,655 mi)

TACHELES [ˈtaxələs] was a 12U CubeSat developed by the German company Neurospace launched on 1 April 2026 as a rideshare payload on NASA's Artemis II mission. The satellite was designed to test lunar rover electronics in deep space, including radiation exposure in the Van Allen belts.

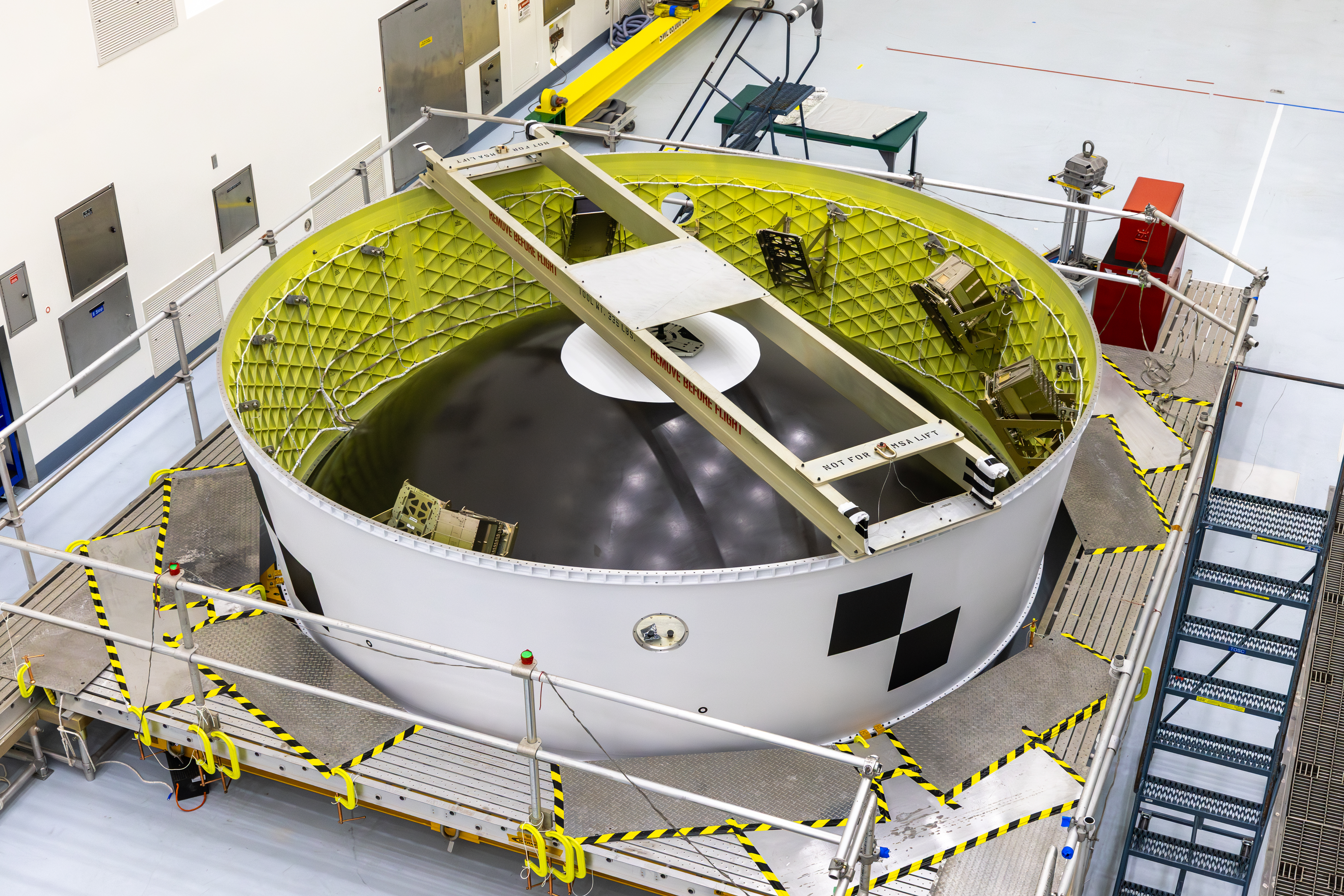
Artemis II payload integration

== Background ==
The mission was developed in Berlin by Neurospace, Germany, with support from Berlin Partner for Business and Technology and the German Aerospace Center (DLR). The mission was funded by the German Federal Ministry for Economic Affairs and Climate Action (BMWK). An international agreement was signed between DLR and NASA to facilitate the mission. The name is from the German Tacheles, "straight talk," which is itself derived from Yiddish תּכלית (takhles, 'purpose, result').

== Technology ==
TACHELES carried the SELDOM (Single Event Latchup Detection On Moon) scientific payload, consisting of three independent electronic units designed to study single-event effects and the potential use of commercial electronics in space applications, was developed by the Ernst-Abbe-Hochschule Jena and the student association VESPE Jena e.V. The payload tests a single-event latch-up protection circuit as well as algorithms for detecting and correcting single-event upsets. The satellite also integrated electronics from the HiveR rover, which will be raised to an altitude of over 38,000 km (24,000 mi), passing through both Van Allen radiation belts. The data collected would provide insights into the radiation environment and help optimize rover electronics for future lunar missions.

== Timeline ==
The probe was handed over to NASA on 16 September 2025. TACHELES and Artemis II launched on 1 April 2026. The TACHELES mission was expected to last at least two years passing through the Van Allen belts on a regular basis. Despite a successful deployment, ground stations were unable to establish communications with TACHELES. The spacecraft was planned to fire its propulsion systems to raise its perigee and stay in orbit. However, it was not able to do so, and burned up in the atmosphere.

== See also ==
- Artemis II
- ATENEA (satellite)
- K-RadCube
- Space Weather CubeSat-1
