= Neurospace =

German aerospace company

NEUROSPACE GmbH
- Industry: Aerospace, Robotics
- Founded: 2020
- Founder: Irene Selvanathan
- Headquarters: Berlin, Germany
- Products: aerospace robotics
- Website: neuro-space.de

NEUROSPACE GmbH is a German aerospace and robotics company founded in 2020 in Berlin, Germany, by Irene Selvanathan.

The company focuses on the development of modular robotic systems for terrestrial, lunar, and deep-space missions. NEUROSPACE gained international recognition through its contribution to NASA's Artemis II program with Tacheles, a 12U CubeSat experiment designed to validate radiation-hard rover electronics in deep space.
