= Wolfgang Branoner =

German politician

- Born: 15 April 1956; Schöneberg, West Berlin, West Germany
- Education: "Fachhochschulen für öffentliche Verwaltung", Berlin "Verwaltungsakademie Berlin"
- Occupations: Politician; Berlin Senator for Economics, Business and Technology; Businessman
- Political party: CDU
- Spouse: Sabine Spröde
- Children: 2

Wolfgang Branoner (born 15 April 1956) is a Berlin politician (CDU) and businessman. (More recently he has become a business consultant.) As Berlin's high-profile senator for Economics, Business and Technology he took a notably pro-business stance. His opposition to excessive regulation was evident in his eye-catching 1999 proposal for a federal (i.e. national) law to limit the power of state ("Länder" i.e.regional) governments to impose restrictive opening hours on shops.

== Life ==
Branoner was born in the Schöneberg quarter of West Berlin. While he was still small his mother moved with the family to Neukölln (Berlin) where he grew up the eldest son in a family without a father. Branoner was only 19 in 1975 when he joined the centre-right CDU (party).

He studied "Verwaltungswissenschaften" (loosely, "Public Administration") in Berlin between 1973 and 1984, attending the Berlin Technical Academy for Public Administration ("Fachhochschulen für öffentliche Verwaltung", as the Berlin School of Economics and Law was known at that time) and the "Verwaltungsakademie Berlin" ("Berlin Academy for Administration"). He emerged with a degree in "Verwaltungswissenschaften" in 1978 and a second degree in "Kameralismus" (loosely, "Public Accounting and Management") in 1984. During this time, in 1978, took a job with the council for Berlin's Neukölln "Bezirk" ("administrative district"). His professional career progressed in 1980 when he joined the staff of Harry Ristock, Berlin's (SPD) Berlin Senator for Housing and Construction. A succession of administrative posts with the Berlin Senate followed between 1980 and 1985.

In 1985 Branoner returned to working for the council at Neukölln, but now as "Bezirksstadtrat für Bau und Wohnungswesen", the senior official responsible for Housing and Construction in the borough. He was still in the job when street protestors broke through the Berlin Wall in November 1989. During the next few month social and political changes took place which were followed, formally in October 1990. by German reunification. Berlin's inner boroughs were affected by major population shifts during the reunification process, which gave Branoner's role an unexpected importance and a heightened public profile. In 1991 he was recruited by the Berlin senator Volker Hassemer to work as secretary of state in the city's Department for Urban Development and Environmental Protection. This was an appointed rather than an elective post, but Branoner's political sympathies (which were aligned with those of the senator heading up the department in which he served) were no secret. He was an enthusiastic backer of Chancellor Kohl, whose "shirt-sleeve openness" (""hemdsärmlige Offenheit") he greatly admired.

The 1995 Berlin state election resulted in a return to power of the existing "Grand coalition" city government, but Senator Hassemer was one of several senators who resigned their seats at the end of 1995. With the redistribution of senatorial positions at the start of 1996 Wolfgang Branoner, as Hassemer's Secretary of State, might have been expected to inherit Hassemer's senatorial position and responsibilities, but that did not happen. Instead, in February 1996 he was switched to the senate's Economics and Business department, again as secretary of state. The city government was headed up by the Mayor Eberhard Diepgen throughout the decade 1981–1991. There is a reference to Diepgen having shared his opinion in 1997 that Branoner, though very obviously ambitious, was "too young" and "nicht ministrabel" (in other words, "unsuitable for election to the Berlin senate"). According to at least one source, by 1998 Branoner's political career showed every sign of having peaked.

In 1998, slightly unexpectedly, Elmar Pieroth resigned his senate seat. The decision on a successor was one that, in reality, would be taken by the party (which could be expected to pay close heed to any opinions shared by the mayor). Branoner was not a typical Berlin politician, but he was an eloquent speaker and a good communicator more generally. In November 1998, following a series of senatorial resignations, new elections among the members of the Berlin parliament were organised in order to fill the empty places. Mayor Diepgen, after failing to identify a candidate who would enjoy wider support from the business community, Diepgen let it be known in October 1998 that Branoner's candidacy had his support. In the end Branoner received 132 of the 200 votes cast by members of the Berlin parliament. He remained in office till the collapse of the Diepgen administration [in the wake of the Berlin banking scandals of June 2001, at which point Branoner was one of a number of senators who resigned with the mayor.

After 2001 Brananoner moved across to the private sector. Between 2001 and 2003 he worked in various sales related functions with T-Systems, an IT service company that originated as part of Deutsche Telekom. In August 2003 he moved to Microsoft Germany where, till his departure in July 2006, he held a board-level position as was "Director Public Sector". Since January 2007 he has worked as a partner with SNPC, a Berlin business consultancy, taking over as senior partner in July 2011.

== Personal ==
Wolfgang Branoner has been married twice. His first marriage, to Sabine Spröde, produced two children but ended in 2001.
