= SHAMS (satellite) =

Saudi deep-space cubesat

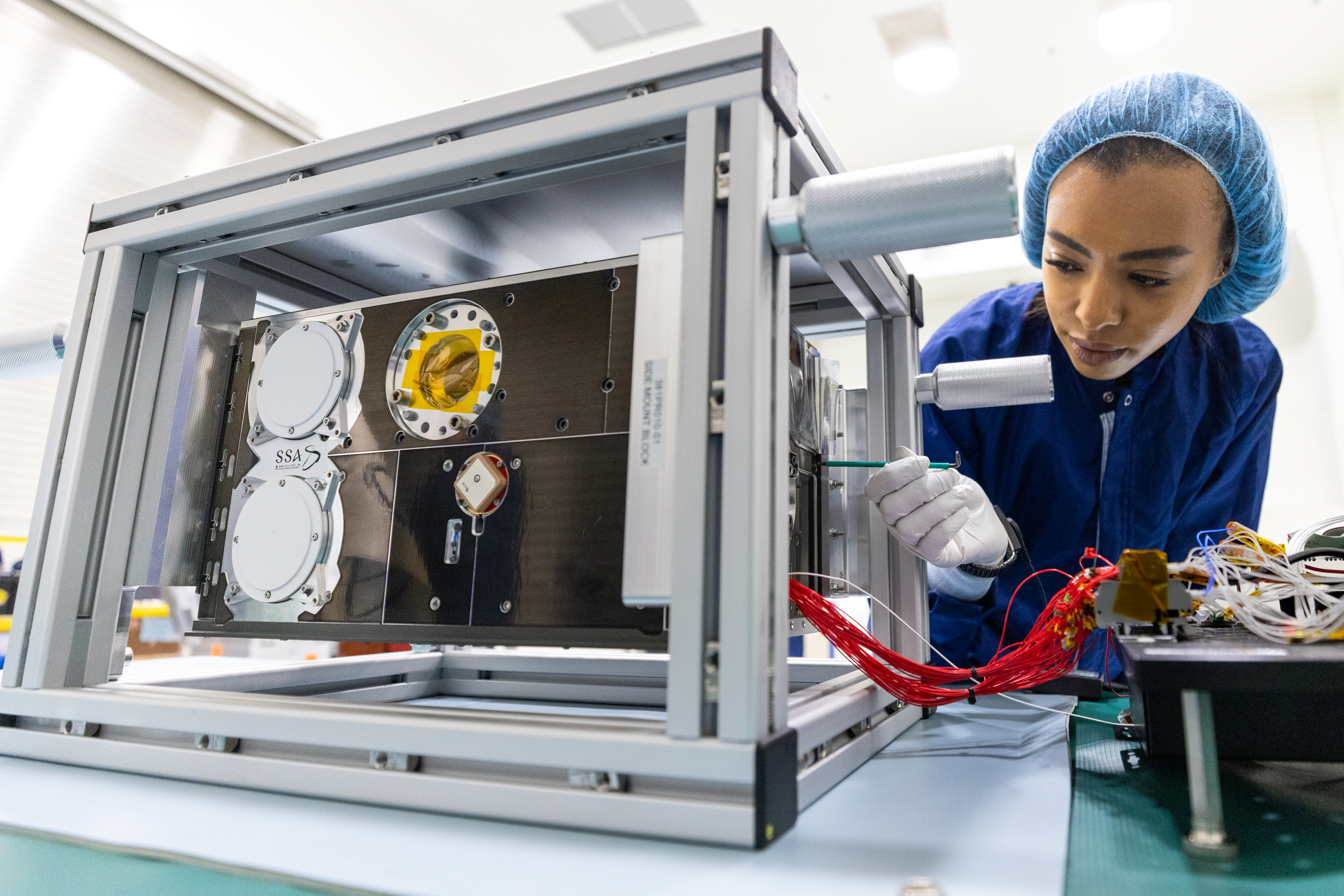
- Technician inspects the Saudi Space Agency’s Shams.
- Operator: Saudi Space Agency
- COSPAR ID: 2026-069C
- SATCAT no.: 68540

Spacecraft properties
- Bus: 12U CubeSat
- Manufacturer: Saudi Space Agency

Start of mission
- Launch date: April 1, 2026, 22:35:00 UTC (6:35 pm EDT)
- Rocket: Space Launch System
- Launch site: LC-39B
- Contractor: NASA

Orbital parameters
- Reference system: Geocentric orbit
- Regime: High Earth orbit
- Perigee altitude: 493 km (306 mi)
- Apogee altitude: 70,235 km (43,642 mi)
- SHAMS's mission patch Artemis Program

SHAMS (Arabic: شمس, meaning: Sun) (or SHMS, also referred to as Space Weather CubeSat-1 (SWC-1)) is a 12U CubeSat developed by Saudi Arabia's Space Agency as a rideshare payload on the Artemis II mission. The probe's primary mission is to study the effects of space weather in the cislunar environment outside of Earth's magnetic field.

== Background ==
In July 2024, Saudi Arabia and the United States signed a framework agreement to promote space cooperation between the two countries. In part due to this agreement, a Saudi rideshare mission was selected for Artemis II during Donald Trump's state visit to Saudi Arabia on May 14, 2025. SHAMS is also meant to demonstrate Saudi abilities to manufacturer and operate satellites, as part of Vision 2030. The Satellite was manufactured by the National Industrial Development and Logistics Program, a Saudi program specifically designed to increase its aerospace industry capacity.

== Mission ==
Animation of SHAMS around Earth SWC-1 · Earth

SHAMS will collect data on the impact of solar activity on the Earth's magnetosphere to help enhance techniques to keep humans safe in space and improve communication abilities. The CubeSat is designed to measure radiation, solar X-rays, charged particles, and magnetic fields in high Earth orbit.

On Saturday, April 3, the SSA would announce that the probes name was Shams despite all NASA documentation naming it the SWC-1. In the same press release the SSA gave more information on the probe's mission, outlining it's elliptical high-earth-orbit as being between 500 km to 70,000 km and that the space weather studies will help develop the reliability of communications, aviation, and navigation technologies.

== See also ==
- Artemis II
- ATENEA (satellite)
- Tacheles (satellite)
- K-RadCube
