= K-RadCube =

Korean deep-space CubeSat

- Operator: Korea AeroSpace Administration
- COSPAR ID: 2026-069D
- SATCAT no.: 68541

Spacecraft properties
- Bus: 12U CubeSat
- Manufacturer: Nara Space Technology
- Launch mass: 19.6 kg (43 lb)

Start of mission
- Launch date: April 1, 2026, 22:35:12 UTC (6:35:12 pm EDT)
- Rocket: Space Launch System
- Launch site: LC-39B
- Contractor: NASA

End of mission
- Decay date: c. April 5, 2026 (presumed)

Orbital parameters
- Reference system: Geocentric
- Regime: High Earth orbit
- Periapsis altitude: 200 kilometres (120 mi)
- Apoapsis altitude: 70,000 kilometres (43,000 mi)
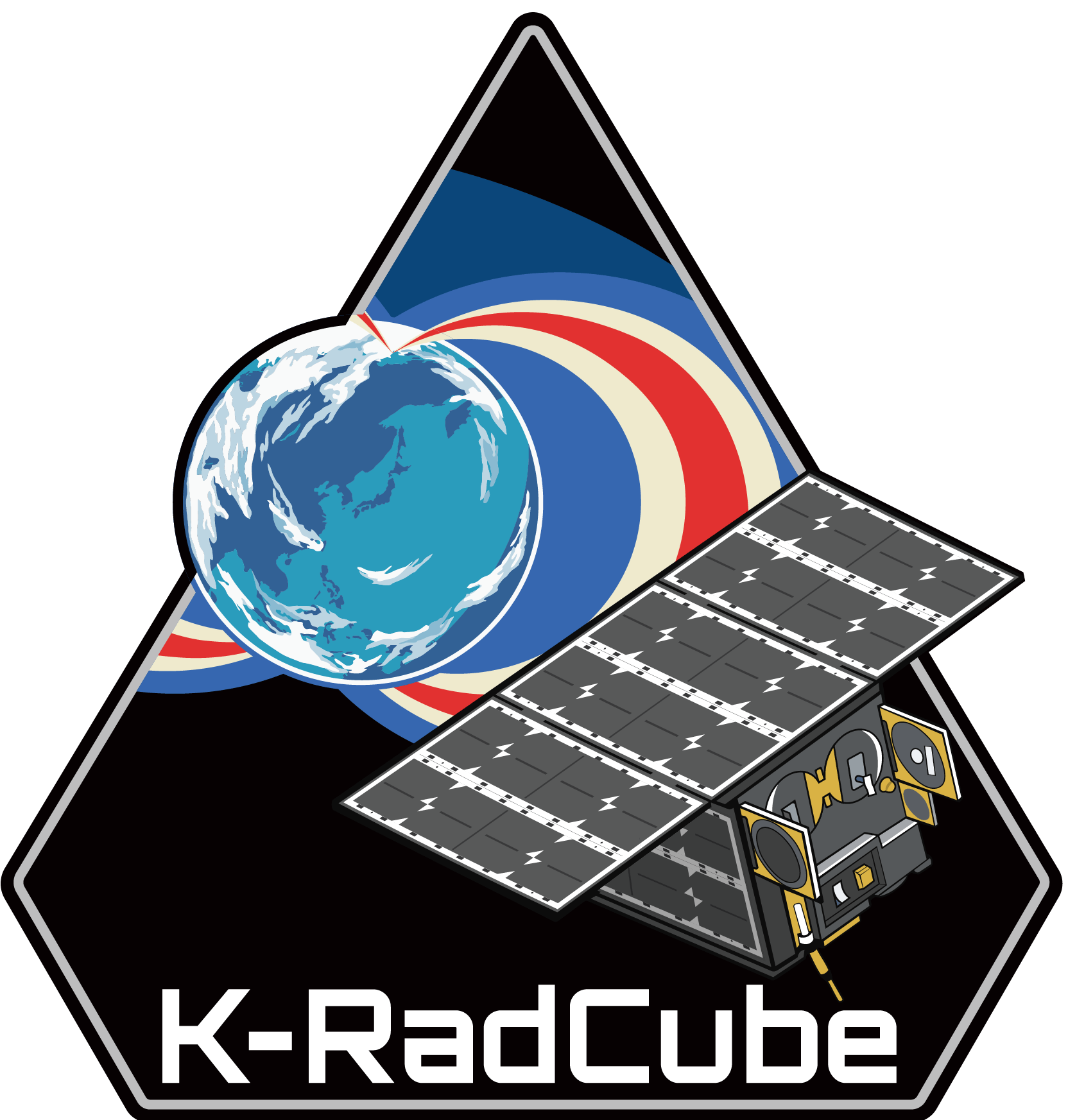
- K-RadCube's mission patch Artemis Program

K-RadCube was a 12U cubesat developed by South Korea's Korea AeroSpace Administration (KASA) as a rideshare payload on the Artemis II mission. The probe's primary mission was to characterize the effects of the Van Allen radiation belt and cislunar radiation environment on a silicone dosimeter designed to mimic human tissue.

After launching on Artemis II on April 1, 2026, the CubeSat separated from the primary Orion spacecraft and deployed into a highly elliptical orbit at 40,000 km. Ground stations reported receiving some telemetry from the satellite, but normal communications were never established. Unable to raise its low 115 km perigee with propulsive burn maneuvers, K-RadCube was presumed to have disintegrated upon atmospheric re-entry on April 5, 2026.

== Background ==
K-RadCube was one of four CubeSats picked from proposals by 50 different countries for the Artemis II mission, and the only one from an East Asian country. The satellite was developed for KASA by Nara Space Technology under supervision by the Korea Astronomy and Space Science Institute (KASI) and operated by KT SAT, a Korean satellite ground station operator. Electronics and components including semiconductors were provided by SK Hynix and Samsung Electronics. The satellite used an electrothermal steam thruster capable of up to 20 mN of thrust at 20 W of power for propulsion. The CubeSat's mass was 19.6 kg (43.2 lb).

== Mission ==
K-RadCube was located inside of the stage adapter ring between the Space Launch System upper stage and the Orion spacecraft. It deployed 5 hours and 23 minutes after launch (03:58 am UTC; 12:58 pm KST) at an altitude of 40,000 km (24,850 mi), with Orion having separated into high Earth orbit (HEO). The satellite continued in a highly elliptical orbit and was expected to reach altitudes ranging from 200 to 70,000 km (124 to 43,500 mi) above the Earth.

The primary mission was to take in situ observations of high-energy particles within and beyond the Van Allen radiation belt. The primary payload was K-RAD-PD, a radiation dosimeter made of silicon designed to measure linear energy transfer, fluxes of protons and electrons, and total absorbed dose. The secondary payload, K-RAD-SS/SK, was to analyze the effects of radiation on semiconductors and flight electronics. Its data was to be used to characterize the radiation resistance of semiconductors and integrated circuits by Samsung and SK Hynix.

After deployment, the CubeSat was intended to establish radio communication with one of a number of ground stations. Operators were to raise the satellite's perigee from 115 km (72 mi) to 150 km (93 mi) during the initial orbit, and again to 200 km (124 mi) in the second orbit, using a steam jet thruster on the satellite.

== Anomaly ==
=== Loss of communications ===
KT SAT oversaw integrated mission control through a network of five ground stations. Attempts to contact the satellite began about ten minutes after deployment, using ground stations in Spain, Chile, and Hawaii. The first signal, a weak one, was detected at about 05:30 UTC on April 2 by the ground station in Maspalomas in the Canary Islands, roughly an hour and a half after deployment. At 12:57 UTC the same day, the ground station in Hawaii received abnormal telemetry from the satellite, which was determined to be incomplete.

On April 3, KASA and KASI announced that signals had been received in some passes but that normal communications, including the collection of observation data, had not been achieved. It was not confirmed whether the perigee-raising maneuver had been carried out from HEO. The mission operations team continued attempting contact, including after the first perigee passage in case the satellite had survived, but detected no further signal, and KASA announced the signal loss on April 4. Absent a successful orbit raise, the CubeSat is presumed to have disintegrated upon atmospheric re-entry.

By April 5, K-RadCube could no longer be detected by ground stations. Its last telemetered position was about 68,000 km (42,250 mi) above the Earth, near its apoapsis, a distance record for a Korean CubeSat. KASA reported it to be the farthest reception of a signal from a Korean satellite other than the lunar orbiter Danuri. It was also described as the first reception of a signal from a Korean CubeSat beyond geostationary orbit.

=== Possible causes ===
As of October 2026, KASA and the satellite's developers have not published a root-cause for the loss of communications. Korean media suggested that the satellite may have failed to raise its perigee and reentered the atmosphere, that the signal may have weakened with distance, or that attitude control may have failed to keep the antenna pointed at Earth. News in Space listed electrical power system faults, antenna deployment failure, attitude control errors, and software problems as possible contributing factors.

=== Response ===
In April 2026, the head of KASA's Space Science and Exploration Division, Kang Kyung-in, said that it was encouraging that a CubeSat with private-sector participation had joined an international crewed exploration mission, but regretted that no observational data could be obtained. KASA administrator Oh Tae-seok called the flight "valuable", citing its deep-space deployment and design and verification data. The agency said it would analyze data from the mission for use in developing a Korean lunar lander and a next-generation CubeSat platform.

== Gallery ==
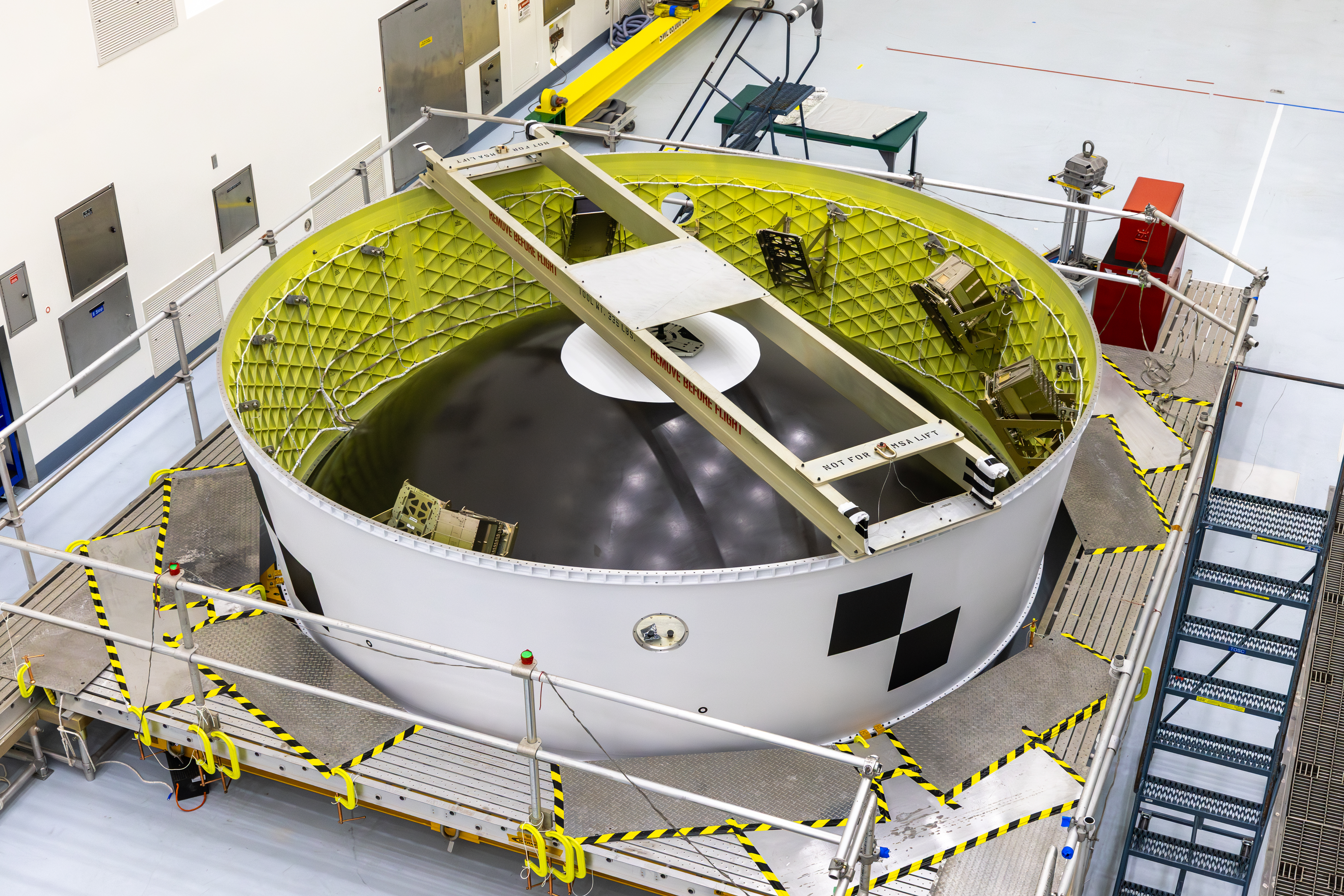
SLS stage adapter ring with 4 rideshare CubeSats

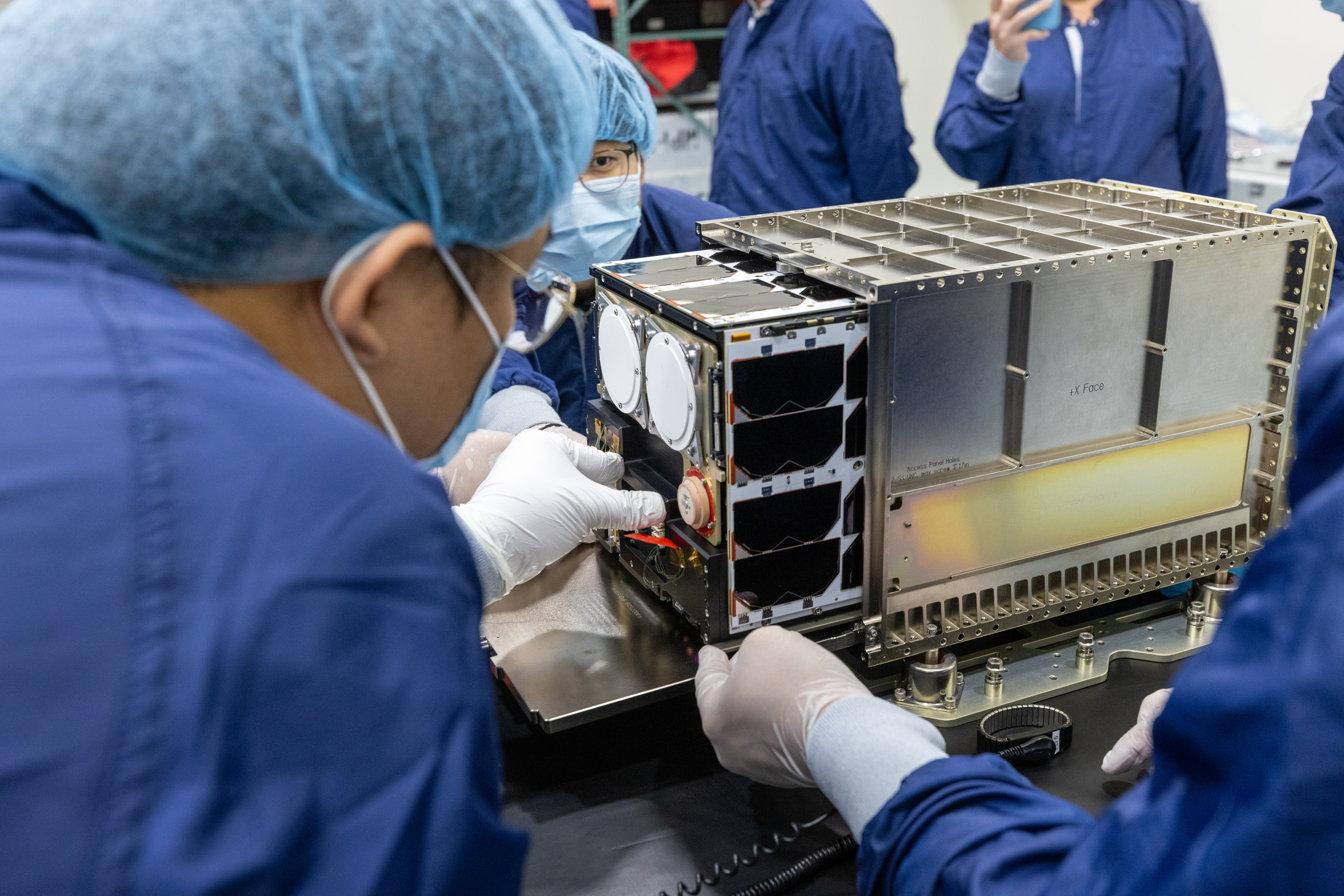
Technicians performing checks on K-RadCube

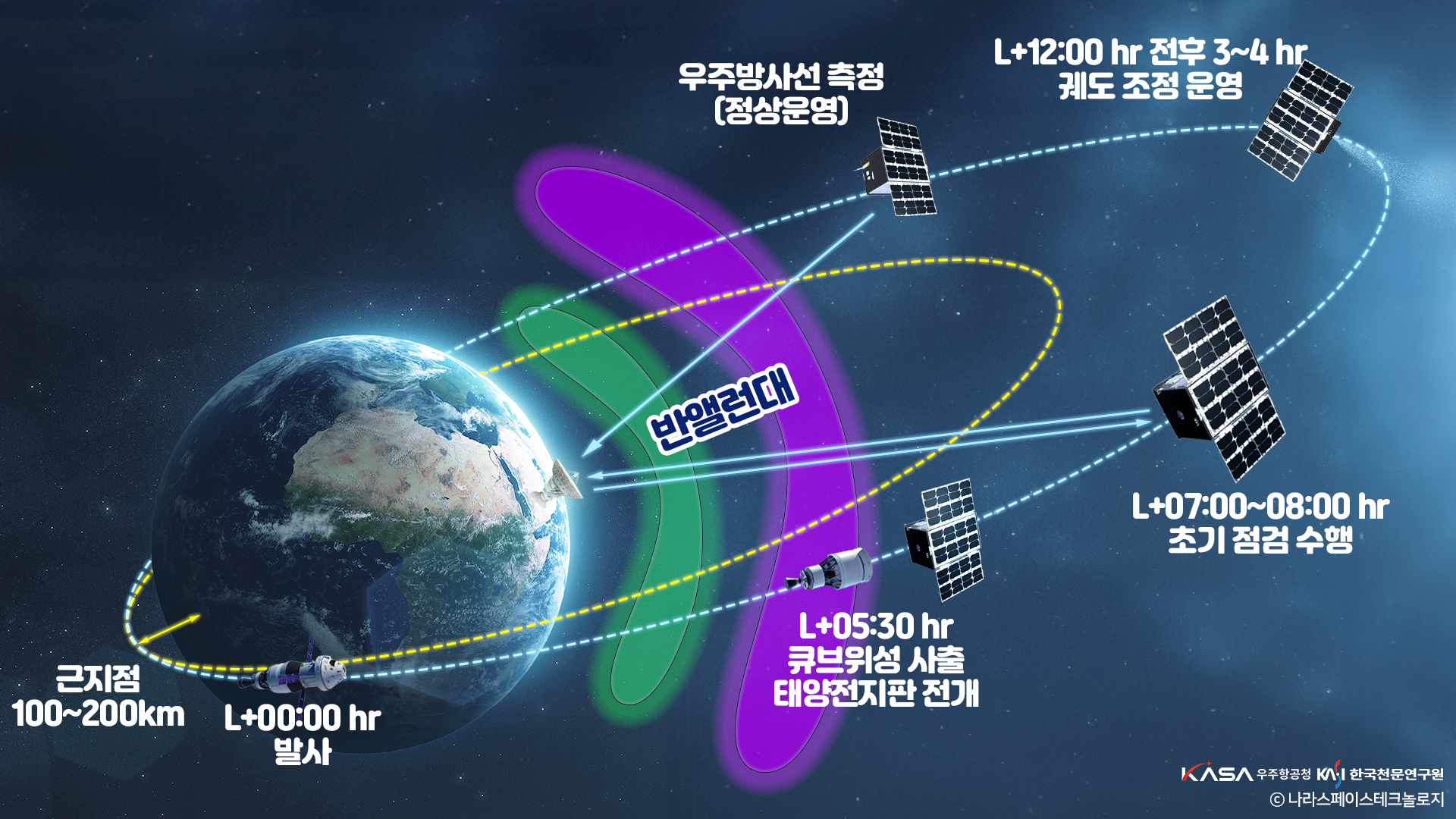
Mission concept and trajectory graphic by KASA (green/purple: inner and outer Van Allen belts)

== See also ==
- Artemis II
- ATENEA (satellite)
- Tacheles (satellite)
- Space Weather CubeSat-1
