= Space Launch System =

NASA super heavy-lift expendable rocket used in the Artemis program

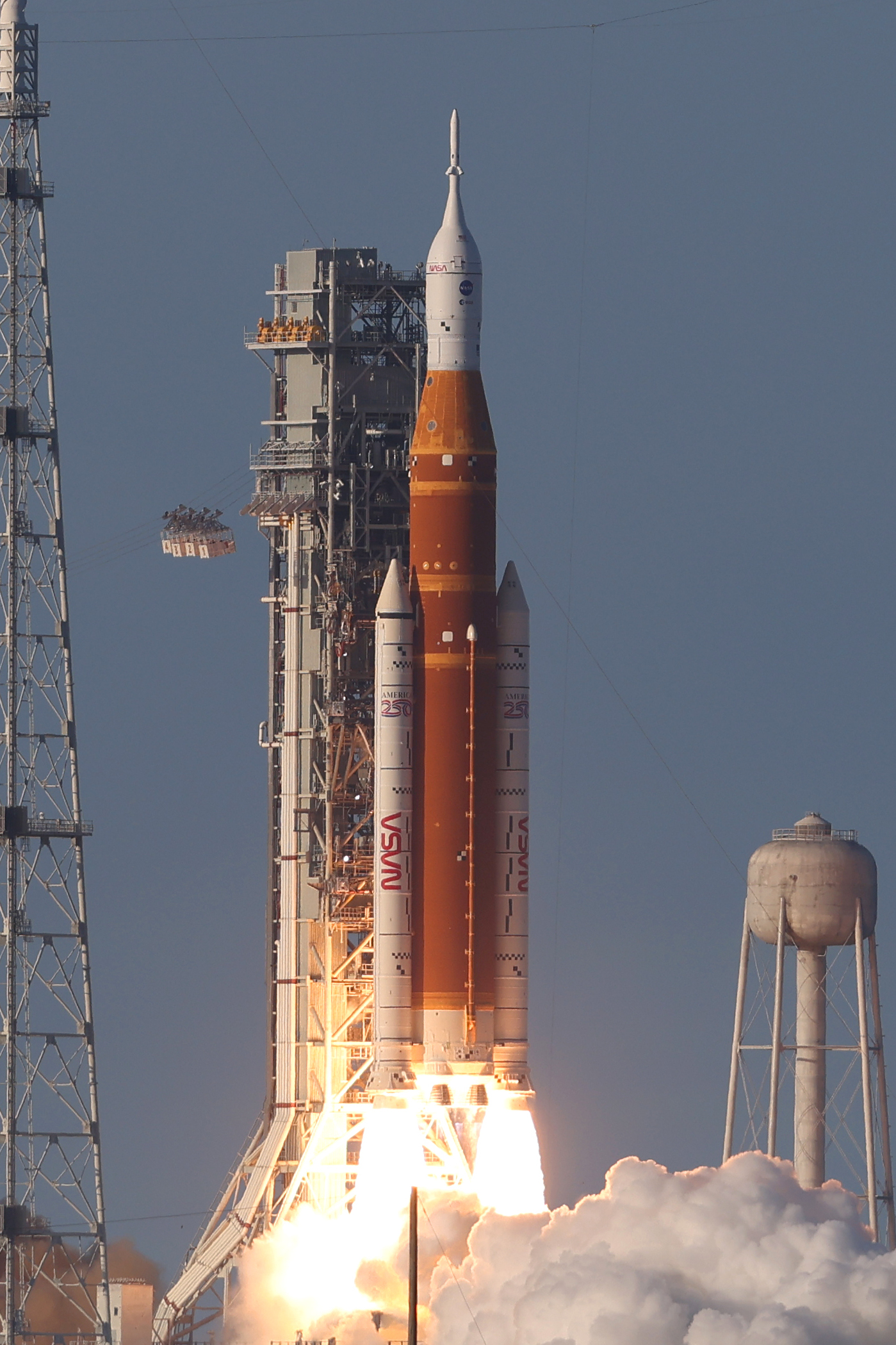
- SLS with the Orion spacecraft launching from Pad 39B for Artemis II
- Function: Super heavy-lift launch vehicle
- Manufacturer: Aerojet Rocketdyne; Boeing; Northrop Grumman; United Launch Alliance
- Country of origin: United States
- Project cost: US$31.6 billion as of 2025 (excluding Orion)
- Cost per launch: US$2.5 billion (excluding Orion)
- Cost per year: US$2.6 billion (FY23) (excluding Orion)

Size
- Height: 98 m (322 ft)
- Diameter: 8.4 m (27.6 ft)
- Mass: 2,610,000 kg (5,750,000 lb)
- Stages: 2 1/2
- Maximum thrust: 39 MN (8,800,000 lbf)

Capacity

Payload to LEO
- Altitude: 200 km (120 mi)
- Orbital inclination: 28.5°
- Mass: 95,000 kg (209,000 lb)

Payload to TLI
- Mass: 27,000 kg (59,500 lb)

Associated rockets
- Based on: Ares V; Delta IV; Space Shuttle
- Comparable: Energia; Falcon Heavy; Long March 9; N1; New Glenn 9x4; Saturn V; Starship

Launch history
- Status: Active
- Launch sites: Kennedy, LC-39B
- Total launches: 2
- Success(es): 2
- First flight: November 16, 2022
- Last flight: April 1, 2026
- Carries passengers or cargo: Orion (crew of 4)

Boosters – five-segment SRB
- No. boosters: 2
- Height: 54 m (177 ft)
- Diameter: 3.7 m (12 ft)
- Gross mass: 730,000 kg (1,600,000 lb)
- Maximum thrust: SL: 14.6 MN (3,280,000 lbf); vac: 16 MN (3,600,000 lbf)
- Total thrust: SL: 29.2 MN (6,560,000 lbf); vac: 32 MN (7,200,000 lbf)
- Specific impulse: 269 s (2.64 km/s)
- Burn time: 126 seconds
- Propellant: APCP (Al / AP / PBAN)

First stage – Core
- Height: 64.6 m (212 ft)
- Diameter: 8.4 m (28 ft)
- Empty mass: 97,940 kg (215,910 lb)
- Gross mass: 1,085,410 kg (2,392,910 lb)
- Propellant mass: LH_{2}: 144,000 kg (317,000 lb); LOX: 840,000 kg (1,860,000 lb)
- Powered by: 4 × RS-25
- Maximum thrust: SL: 7.4 MN (1,672,000 lbf); vac: 9.1 MN (2,049,200 lbf)
- Specific impulse: SL: 366 s (3.59 km/s); vac: 452 s (4.43 km/s)
- Burn time: 480 seconds
- Propellant: LOX / LH_{2}

Second stage – ICPS
- Height: 13.7 m (45 ft)
- Diameter: LH_{2} tank: 5 m (16 ft); LOX tank: 3.2 m (10 ft)
- Empty mass: 3,490 kg (7,690 lb)
- Gross mass: 32,066 kg (70,693 lb)
- Powered by: 1 × RL10
- Maximum thrust: 110.1 kN (24,800 lb_{f})
- Specific impulse: 465.5 s (4.565 km/s)
- Burn time: 1,125 seconds
- Propellant: LOX / LH_{2}

Second stage – Centaur V (planned)
- Height: 16.3–17.5 m (53–57 ft)
- Diameter: 5.4 m (18 ft)
- Propellant mass: ~82,000 kg (181,000 lb)
- Powered by: 2 × RL10
- Maximum thrust: >460 s (4.5 km/s)
- Propellant: LOX / LH_{2}

The Space Launch System (SLS) is an American two-stage super heavy-lift expendable rocket used by NASA. The primary launch vehicle for the Artemis program, SLS is designed to launch the four-person Orion spacecraft. The rocket first launched in November 2022, carrying the uncrewed Artemis I mission. Its only crewed launch has been for the Artemis II lunar flyby in April 2026, becoming the second launch vehicle to carry humans beyond low Earth orbit (LEO), after NASA's Saturn V of the Apollo program.

Development of SLS began in 2011 as a congressionally mandated replacement for the retiring Space Shuttle program and the cancelled Ares I and Ares V launch vehicles of the Constellation program, incorporating some hardware from both programs. Costing US$31.6 billion as of 2025, the project has been criticized for mismanagement, budget overruns, and delays, but ultimately succeeded in human spaceflight in 2026.

All SLS launches take place from Launch Complex 39B at the Kennedy Space Center in Florida. The new Boeing-built core stage is powered by four ex-Shuttle RS-25 engines. Attached to the core are two Northrop Grumman five-segment Solid Rocket Boosters, built for the Ares vehicles, tested on Ares I-X, developed from the Shuttle's four-segment SRB. SLS currently uses the Interim Cryogenic Propulsion Stage (ICPS) as its second stage, for the insertions to low Earth orbit and trans-lunar injection. ICPS uses the RL10 engine, and was derived from the Delta Cryogenic Second Stage designed by Japan's space agency. Aerojet Rocketdyne builds the RS-25 and RL10 engines.

Starting from Artemis IV, SLS will use the Centaur V upper stage, developed for the Vulcan Centaur, instead of ICPS. NASA previously planned to upgrade SLS from its current Block 1 configuration to a Block 1B and Block 2, but cancelled these plans in February 2026, aiming to standardize on Block 1. Block 1B was to use the Exploration Upper Stage, and Block 2 would have used new solid rocket boosters. There plans were included in Section 10812 the most recent NASA Authorization Act and have not been rescinded by Congress.

While SLS has the highest liftoff thrust of any rocket to ever carry humans, 39 meganewtons (8,800,000 pounds-force), (Note: The Soviet N-1 rocket produced 45.7 MN and was also designed to carry humans to the Moon, but was never flown manned. SpaceX Starship is also planned to carry humans, and has demonstrated liftoff thrust exceeding 70 MN.) SLS's payload capacity to trans-lunar injection of 27 metric tons (59,525 lb) is only around half that of the Saturn V's 48.6 metric tons (107,145 lb) payload. Thus for Artemis lunar landings, beginning with Artemis IV targeted early 2028, Orion is planned to dock with the Human Landing System (HLS) in lunar orbit or low Earth orbit, separately launched on a non-SLS rocket; SpaceX's Starship HLS and Blue Origin's Blue Moon are under development as HLS vehicles.

Its next scheduled flight is Artemis III, a 2027 low Earth orbit docking test between Orion and HLS vehicles.

== Components ==
The SLS is a Space Shuttle-derived launch vehicle. Its first stage consists of a central core stage powered by four engines, flanked by two space shuttle-derived solid rocket boosters.

NASA had planned to introduce upgraded variants of the rocket. The Block 1B configuration was to incorporate a larger, purpose-built upper stage, while the Block 2 configuration was to feature newly developed solid rocket boosters. On February 26, 2026, NASA announced that it would standardize the Block 1 configuration and pursue alternative upper-stage options.

=== Core stage ===
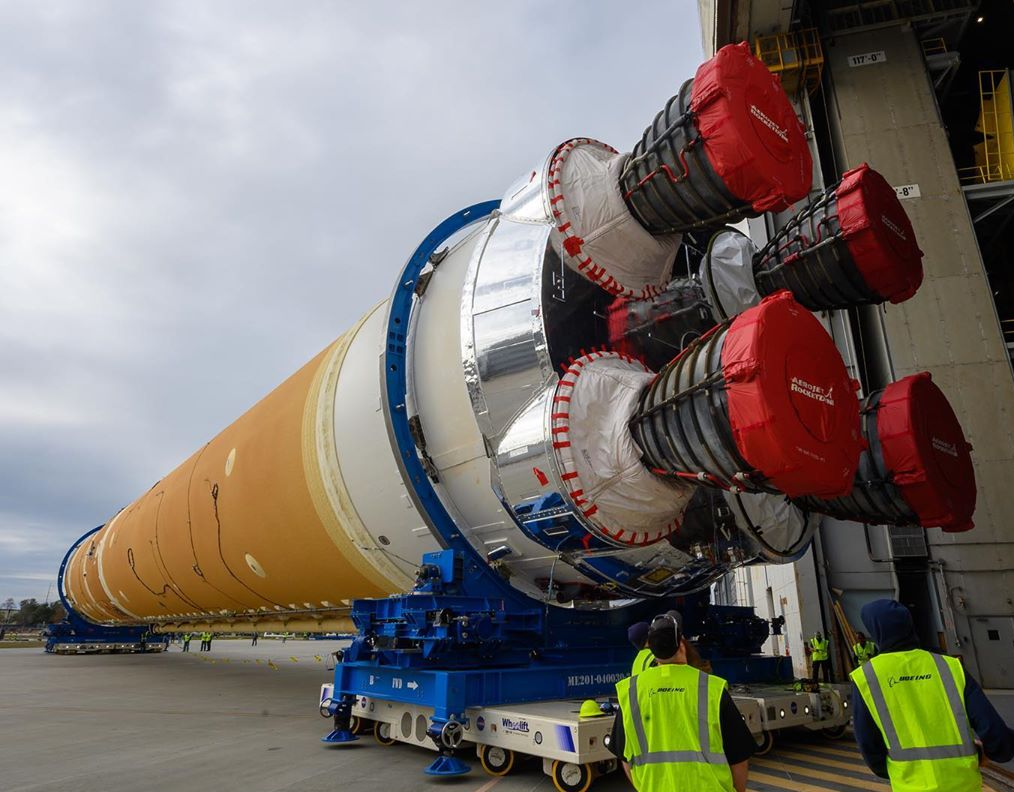
The SLS core stage rolling out of the Michoud Assembly Facility

The SLS core stage is built by Boeing at NASA's Michoud Assembly Facility in New Orleans. It measures 65 meters (213 ft) in length and 8.4 meters (28 ft) in diameter, matching the diameter of the Space Shuttle external tank to allow NASA to leverage Shuttle-era experience. The stage is visually similar to the Shuttle tank due to its rust-colored spray-on insulation.

The stage contains liquid hydrogen and liquid oxygen propellant tanks, the attach points for the solid rocket boosters, avionics, equipment for autogenous pressurization of the tanks, and the Main Propulsion System (MPS), an assembly of four RS-25 engines with associated plumbing and hydraulic gimbal actuators. The first core stages reused MPS plumbing removed from the three remaining Space Shuttle orbiters following their decommissioning. The core stage, when combined with the solid rocket boosters, is capable of propelling the Orion spacecraft into a highly elliptical orbit without the upper stage firing, though the upper stage is required for trans-lunar injection.

The core stage structure is primarily made of 2219 aluminum alloy, and compared to the Space Shuttle external tank, several manufacturing improvements were incorporated. Production began in 2014, but delays in manufacturing, testing, and integration postponed the readiness of the first flight article by several years. It uses ten barrel-shaped main sections, four domes, and seven rings.

The first four SLS missions will each use four of the remaining fourteen RS-25D engines left over from the Space Shuttle program. The final two engines needed were assembled from existing RS-25D spare parts. Aerojet Rocketdyne refurbished these engines with modernized controllers, expanded throttle capability, and additional insulation to handle the higher thermal environment caused by proximity to the solid rocket boosters. Later flights will transition to the RS-25E, optimized for expendable use, being faster to build and costing 30% less. Thrust for the refurbished RS-25D engines has been increased from 492,000 to 513,000 lb_{f} (2,188 to 2,281 kN), while the RS-25E is rated at 522,000 lb_{f} (2,321 kN) per engine. The first test firing of an RS-25E occurred in June 2025 and was declared successful.

The SLS uses a conical frustum-shaped interstage known as the Launch Vehicle Stage Adapter (LVSA) between the core stage and the narrower diameter upper stage. The LVSA consists of sixteen aluminum-lithium panels made of 2195 aluminum alloy and is built by Teledyne Brown Engineering. The first unit cost approximately $60 million, with the next two costing $85 million combined.

=== Solid rocket boosters ===
==== Shuttle-derived ====
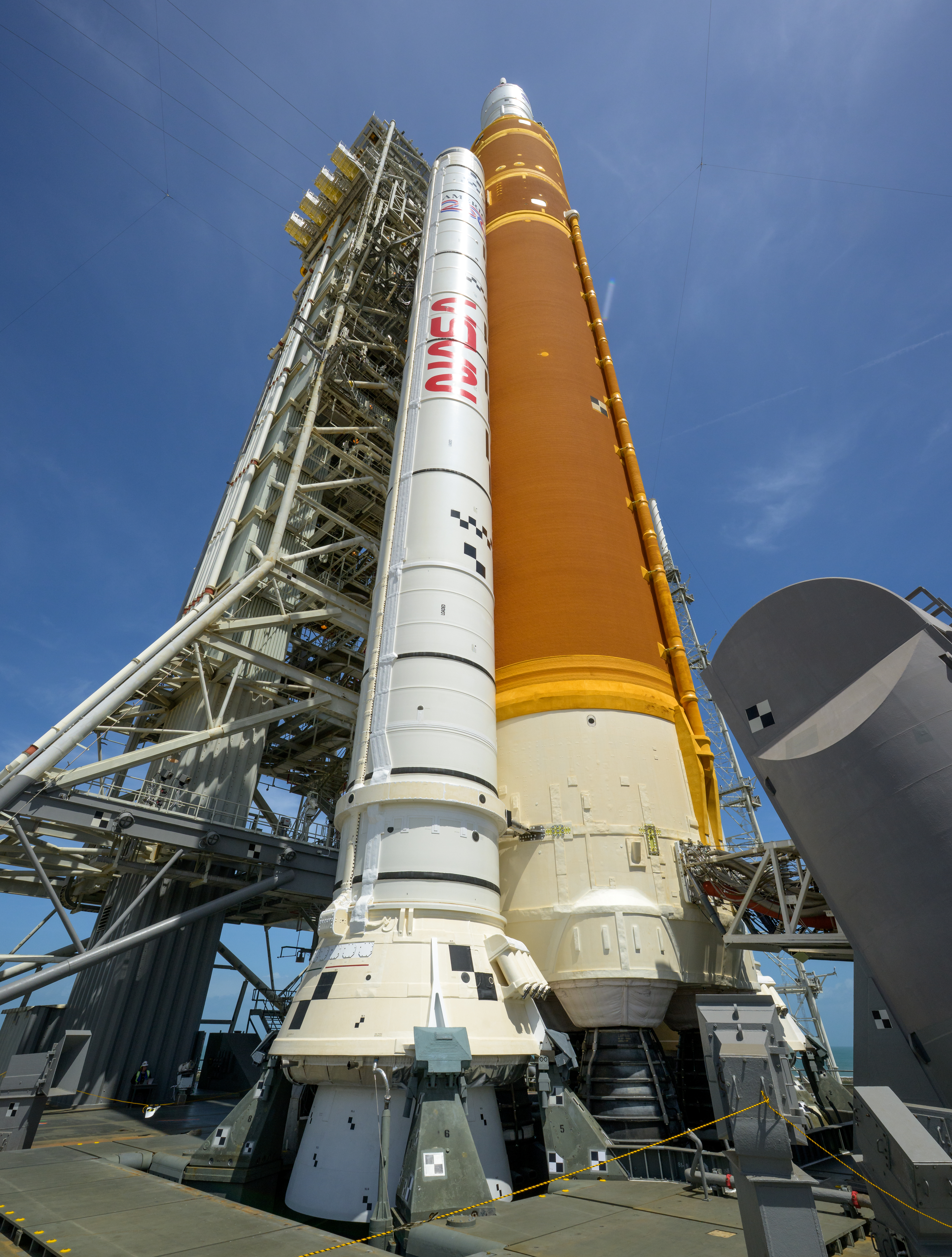
SLS of Artemis II, with side view showing one of the two boosters

The first eight SLS flights are planned to use two five-segment solid rocket boosters derived from the four-segment Space Shuttle Solid Rocket Booster manufactured by Northrop Grumman. The booster for the SLS incorporates casing segments previously flown as part of the Shuttle program, with the addition of a center segment to increase performance. The boosters feature updated avionics and lighter insulation but do not include a parachute recovery system, as they are expended after launch.

The boosters are filled with an ammonium perchlorate composite propellant, consisting of aluminum powder (fuel) and ammonium perchlorate (oxidizer), bound together with polybutadiene acrylonitrile. The mixture has a rubber eraser-like consistency and is cast into each segment.

At liftoff, the two boosters together produce more than 75 percent of the total thrust required to propel SLS. The five-segment configuration provides approximately 25 percent greater total impulse than the Shuttle-era boosters.

The available inventory of Shuttle-era booster casing segments limits use of this configuration to eight SLS flights.

==== BOLE ====
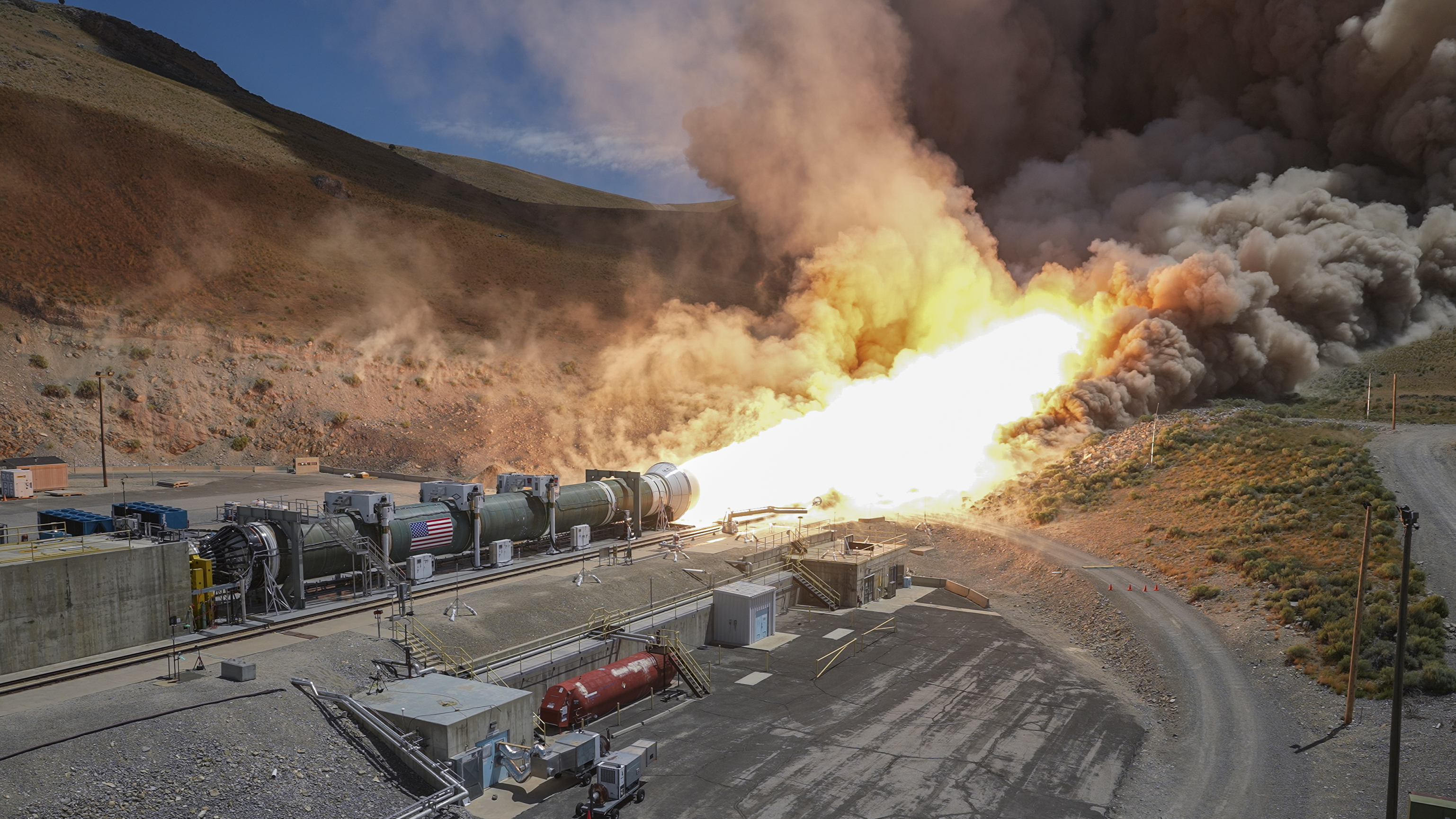
Test fire of BOLE prototype, June 2025

The Booster Obsolescence and Life Extension (BOLE) program was announced in 2019 to develop replacement solid rocket boosters for SLS once the supply of Shuttle-derived hardware is exhausted. In 2021, NASA awarded Northrop Grumman a $3.2 billion contract to produce Shuttle-derived boosters for five missions (Artemis IV–VIII) and to design, develop, and test the new BOLE booster.

The BOLE design replaces Shuttle-era steel motor cases with carbon-fiber composite cases, which are lighter and stronger. It also substitutes the hydraulic thrust vector control system with an electronic system and uses a different propellant formulation derived from Northrop Grumman's commercial solid rocket motors.

Each BOLE booster is designed to produce approximately 3.9 million lb_{f} (17 MN) of thrust, about 19 percent greater than the five-segment Shuttle-derived boosters, thereby increasing overall payload capability.

As of 2025, BOLE remains in development. A prototype was test-fired in June 2025 but experienced a nozzle failure approximately 15 seconds before the end of the motor firing. However, the long-term future of the program is uncertain: SLS was authorized for only five flights at that time, and no funding has been provided for production of operational BOLE boosters.

=== Upper stage ===
==== Interim Cryogenic Propulsion Stage ====
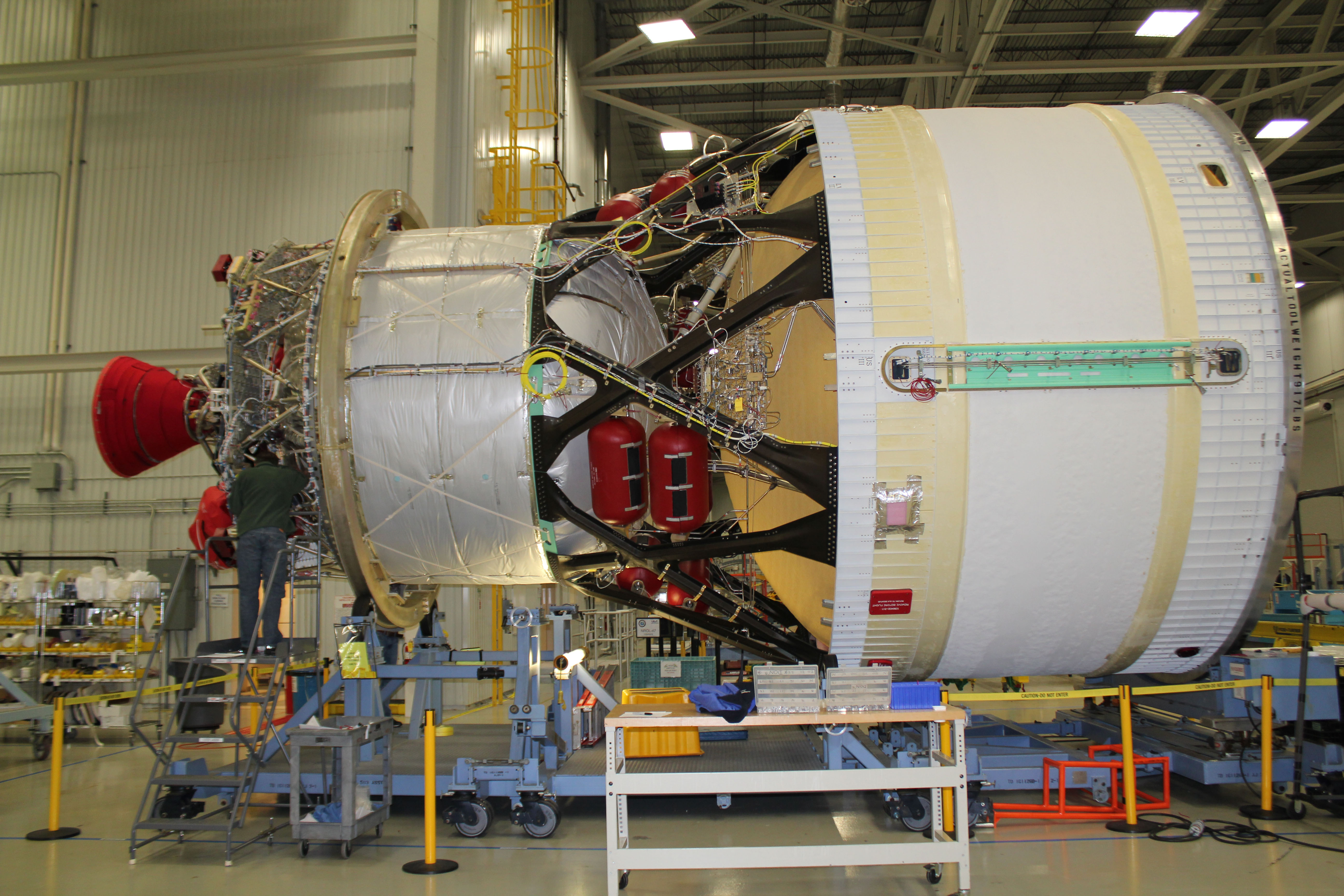
The Artemis I ICPS under construction

The Interim Cryogenic Propulsion Stage (ICPS) is the upper stage used on the initial Block 1 configuration of the SLS. Three ICPS units were built by United Launch Alliance (ULA), a joint venture of Boeing and Lockheed Martin. The ICPS is derived from the Delta Cryogenic Second Stage (DCSS), incorporating minimal modifications for integration with SLS. Following the discontinuation of the DCSS, further ICPS production is no longer available as an option.

The ICPS flown on Artemis I was powered by a single RL10B-2 engine, also built by Aerojet Rocketdyne. The ICPS units flown on Artemis II and planned for use on Artemis IV use a single RL10C-2.

Artemis III will have no ICPS, as it is only a mission to low Earth orbit (LEO), and instead its ICPS will be used for Artemis IV.

==== Exploration Upper Stage (cancelled) ====
The Exploration Upper Stage (EUS) was originally planned to debut on Artemis IV as the upper stage for the Block 1B configuration. It would have shared the 8.4-meter (28 ft) diameter of the SLS core stage and be powered by four RL10C-3 engines, with a later upgrade to improved RL10C-X engines. Although the EUS progressed through design review, it did not enter full-scale hardware production and was ultimately canceled in February 2026, prior to flight.

==== Centaur V (future) ====
In February 2026, NASA announced plans to standardize the SLS on the Block 1 configuration and discontinue development of the EUS. With production of the DCSS ended, NASA selected an existing commercially developed upper stage for missions following depletion of the ICPS stock: ULA's Centaur V, which uses a pair of RL10 engines and is expected to provide modestly improved performance over the ICPS.

=== Block variants ===
| Block | Boosters | Core engines | Upper stage | Liftoff thrust | Payload mass to... | |
| Block | Boosters | Core engines | Upper stage | Liftoff thrust | LEO | TLI |
|---|---|---|---|---|---|---|
| 1 | 5-segment Shuttle-derived boosters | RS-25D | ICPS with RL10C-2 (Note: The ICPS used on Artemis I used the RL10B-2) | 39 MN (8,800,000 lbf) | 95,000 kg (209,000 lb) | >27,000 kg (59,500 lb) |
| 1B | 5-segment Shuttle-derived boosters | RS-25D | EUS with RL10C-3 | 39 MN (8,800,000 lbf) | 105,000 kg (231,000 lb) | 42,000 kg (92,500 lb) (Note: Payload mass is for the cargo variant of the rocket, capacity of the crewed variant is reduced.) |
| 1B | 5-segment Shuttle-derived boosters | RS-25E | EUS with RL10C-3 | 39 MN (8,800,000 lbf) | 105,000 kg (231,000 lb) | 42,000 kg (92,500 lb) |
| 2 | BOLE | RS-25E | EUS with RL10C-3 | 53 MN (11,900,000 lbf) | 130,000 kg (290,000 lb) | >46,000 kg (101,400 lb) |

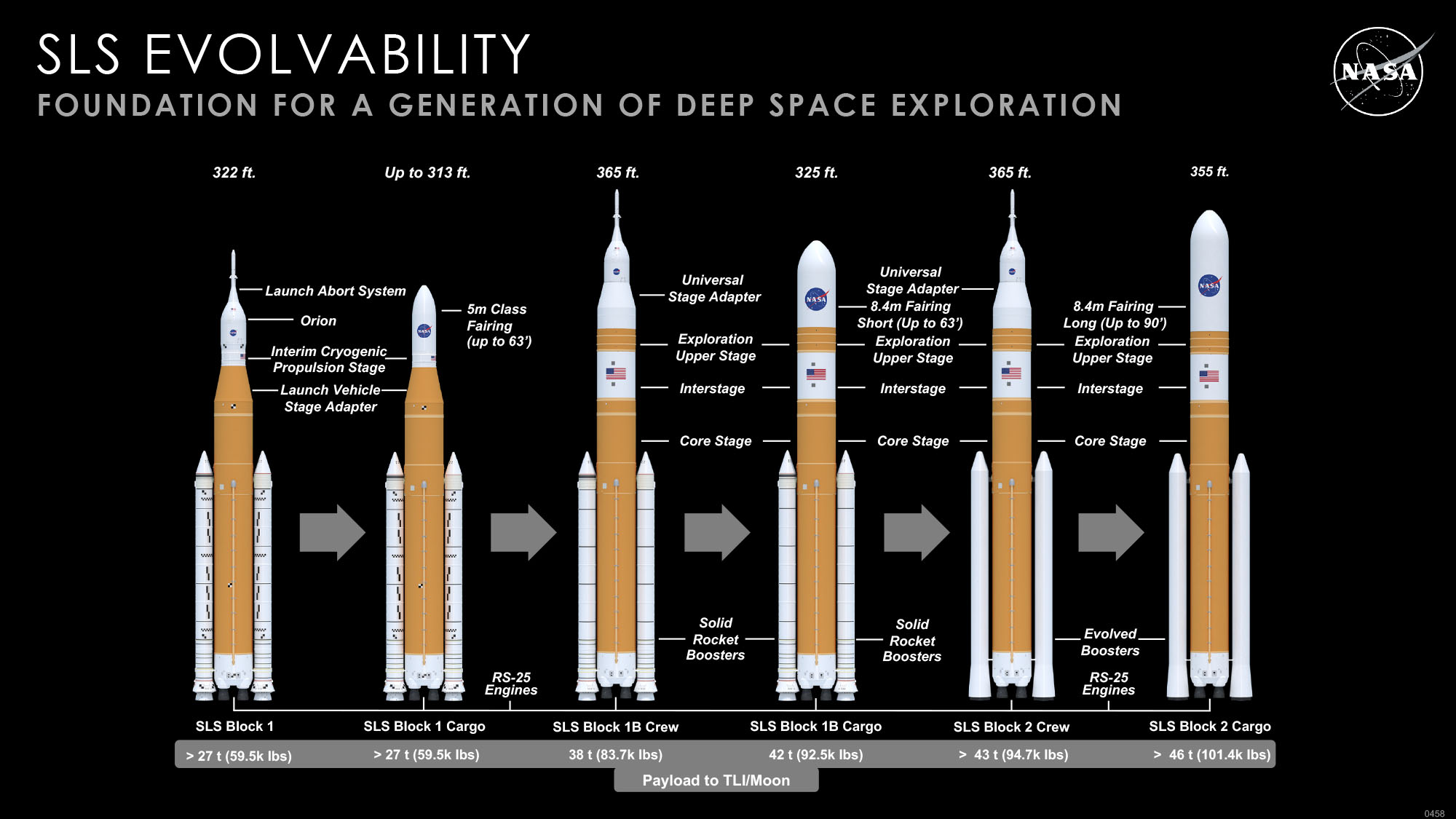
Formerly planned evolution of SLS from Block 1 configuration to various configurations. All variants beyond Block 1 have been cancelled.

== Development ==
=== Funding ===
During the joint Senate-NASA presentation in September 2011, it was stated that the SLS program had a projected development cost of US$18 billion through 2017, with $10 billion for the SLS rocket, $6 billion for the Orion spacecraft, and $2 billion for upgrades to the launch pad and other facilities at Kennedy Space Center. These costs and schedules were considered optimistic in an independent 2011 cost assessment report by Booz Allen Hamilton for NASA. An internal 2011 NASA document estimated the cost of the program through 2025 to total at least $41 billion for four 209,000 lb (95 t) launches (1 uncrewed, 3 crewed), with the 290,000 lb (130 t) version ready no earlier than 2030. The Human Exploration Framework Team estimated unit costs for 'Block 0' at $1.6 billion and Block 1 at $1.86 billion in 2010. However, since these estimates were made, the Block 0 SLS vehicle was dropped in late 2011, and the design was not completed.

In September 2012, an SLS deputy project manager stated that $500 million is a reasonable target average cost per flight for the SLS program. In 2013, the Space Review estimated the cost per launch at $5 billion, depending on the rate of launches. NASA announced in 2013 that the European Space Agency will build the Orion service module. In August 2014, as the SLS program passed its Key Decision Point C review and was deemed ready to enter full development, costs from February 2014 until its planned launch in September 2018 were estimated at $7.021 billion. Ground systems modifications and construction would require an additional $1.8 billion over the same time.

In October 2018, NASA's Inspector General reported that the Boeing core stage contract had made up 40% of the $11.9 billion spent on the SLS as of August 2018. By 2021, development of the core stage was expected to have cost $8.9 billion, twice the initially planned amount. In December 2018, NASA estimated that yearly budgets for the SLS will range from $2.1 to $2.3 billion between 2019 and 2023.

In March 2019, the Trump administration released its fiscal year 2020 budget request for NASA, which notably proposed dropped funding for the Block 1B and 2 variants of SLS. Congressional action ultimately included the funding in the passed budget.

On May 1, 2020, NASA awarded a contract extension to Aerojet Rocketdyne to manufacture 18 additional RS-25 engines with associated services for $1.79 billion, bringing the total RS-25 contract value to almost $3.5 billion.

==== Budget ====
NASA has spent $31.5 billion on SLS development from 2011 through 2025, in nominal dollars. This is equivalent to $38.7 billion in 2026 dollars using the NASA New Start Inflation Indices.

| Fiscal year | Funding | | Source |
| Fiscal year | In Nominal (millions) | In 2026 (millions) | Source |
|---|---|---|---|
| 2011 | $1,536.1 | $2,217.8 | Actual |
| 2012 | $1,497.5 | $2,139.3 | Actual |
| 2013 | $1,414.9 | $1,991.4 | Actual |
| 2014 | $1,600.0 | $2,208.5 | Actual |
| 2015 | $1,678.6 | $2,271.3 | Actual |
| 2016 | $1,971.9 | $2,636.3 | Actual |
| 2017 | $2,127.1 | $2,784.5 | Actual |
| 2018 | $2,150.0 | $2,744.9 | Actual |
| 2019 | $2,144.0 | $2,685.4 | Actual |
| 2020 | $2,528.1 | $3,097.8 | Actual |
| 2021 | $2,555.0 | $3,016.7 | 2021 Operating Plan in 2023 budget |
| 2022 | $2,600.0 | $2,903.9 | 2022 Operating Plan in 2024 budget |
| 2023 | $2,566.8 | $2,754.1 | FY 2023 Op Plan in FY 2025 Budget Request |
| 2024 | $2,600.0 | $2,720.4 | FY 2024 Op Plan in FY 2026 Budget Request |
| 2025 | $2,501.8 | $2,558.6 | FY 2025 Spend Plan |
| Total | $31,471.8 | $38,730.9 | |

Included in the above SLS costs above are the $412 million contract for the Interim Cryogenic Propulsion Stage (ICPS), and the costs of developing the Exploration Upper Stage (EUS), which are detailed in the table below. Excluded from the SLS cost above are the costs to assemble, integrate, prepare and launch the SLS and its payloads, funded separately in the NASA Exploration Ground Systems program, running about $600 million per year in 2021, and rising to $910 million for 2025.

Also excluded are payloads that launch on the SLS, such as the Orion crew capsule, the predecessor programs that contributed to the development of the SLS, such as the Ares V cargo launch vehicle project, funded from 2008 to 2010 for a total of $70 million, and the Ares I crew launch vehicle, funded from 2006 to 2010 for a total of $4.8 billion in development, including the 5-segment Solid Rocket Boosters used on the SLS.

Despite calls from the Trump administration to terminate the SLS program after Artemis III, the 2025 One Big Beautiful Bill Act included $4.1 billion to fund SLS rockets for the Artemis IV and V missions, with mandated minimum spending of $1.025 billion per year from FY 2026 through 29. However, as a compromise, lawmakers suggested eliminating the EUS, and directed NASA to evaluate alternatives such as the Centaur V or New Glenn's GS2 upper stage. In early 2026 this change was implemented with the Centaur V being selected as the future SLS upper stage, replacing the EUS.

| Fiscal year | Funding for EUS development | |
| Fiscal year | Nominal (in million US$) | Inflation adjusted (FY25, in million US$) |
|---|---|---|
| 2016 | 85.0 | 111.1 |
| 2017 | 300.0 | 384.0 |
| 2018 | 300.0 | 374.5 |
| 2019 | 150.0 | 183.7 |
| 2020 | 300.0 | 359.4 |
| 2021 | 400.0 (Note: The FY2021 spending plan indicates that this is for "Block 1B (non-add) (including EUS)") | 461.8 |
| 2022 | 636.7 | 695.3 |
| 2023 | 648.3 | 680.2 |
| 2024 | 465.1 | 475.8 |
| Total | 3,285.1 | 3,725.9 |

=== Early plans ===
Test fire of Shuttle-derived booster, March 2015

The SLS was created by an act of the U.S. Congress in the NASA Authorization Act of 2010, Public Law 111–267, in which NASA was directed to create a system for launching payloads and crew into space that would replace the capabilities lost with the retirement of the Space Shuttle. The act set out certain goals, such as being able to lift 70–100 tons into low earth orbit with evolvability to 130 tons, a target date of December 31, 2016, for the system to be fully operational, and a directive to use "to the extent practicable" existing components, hardware, and workforce from the Space Shuttle and from Ares I.

On September 14, 2011, NASA announced their plan to meet these requirements: the design for the SLS, with the Orion spacecraft as payload.

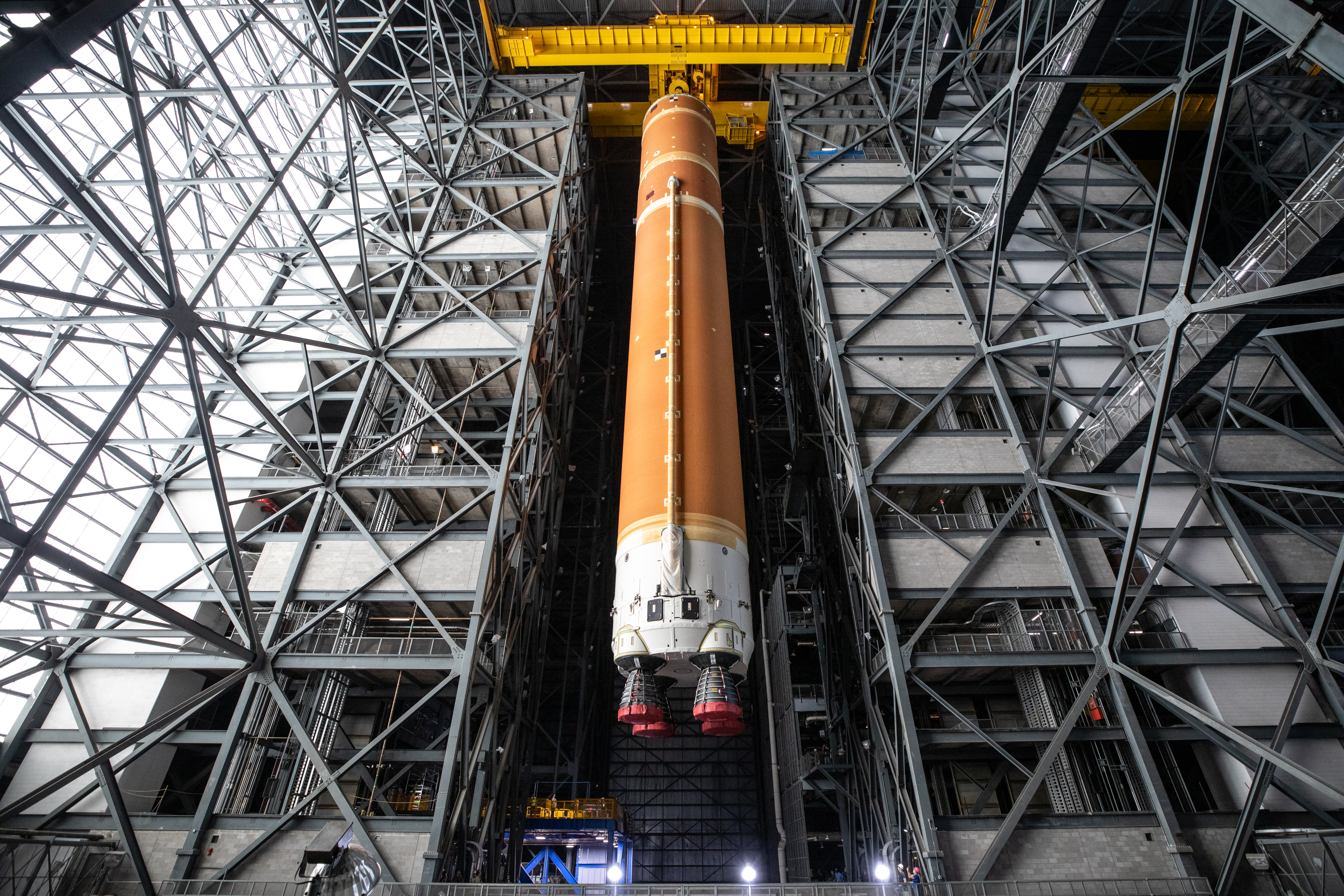
SLS core stage for Artemis II lifted into High Bay 2 of the Vehicle Assembly Building shortly after stacking operations began in December 2024

The SLS has considered several future development routes of potential launch configurations, with the planned evolution of the blocks of the rocket having been modified many times. Many options, all of which just needed to meet the congressionally mandated payload minimums, were considered, including a Block 0 variant with three main engines, a variant with five main engines, a Block 1A variant with upgraded boosters instead of the improved second stage, and a Block 2 with five main engines plus the Earth Departure Stage, with up to three J-2X engines.

In the initial announcement of the design of the SLS, NASA also announced an "Advanced Booster Competition", to select which boosters would be used on Block 2 of the SLS. Several companies proposed boosters for this competition, all of which were indicated as viable: Aerojet and Teledyne Brown proposed three booster engines each with dual combustion chambers, Alliant Techsystems proposed a modified solid rocket booster with lighter casing, more energetic propellant, and four segments instead of five, and Pratt & Whitney Rocketdyne and Dynetics proposed a liquid-fueled booster named Pyrios. However, this competition was planned for a development plan in which Block 1A would be followed by Block 2A, with upgraded boosters. NASA canceled Block 1A and the planned competition in April 2014, in favor of simply remaining with the Ares I's five-segment solid rocket boosters, themselves modified from the Space Shuttle's solid rocket boosters, until at least the late 2020s. The overly powerful advanced booster would have resulted in unsuitably high acceleration, and would need modifications to Launch Complex 39B, its flame trench, and Mobile Launcher.

On July 31, 2013, the SLS passed Preliminary Design Review. The review included not only the rocket and boosters but also ground support and logistical arrangements.

On August 7, 2014, the SLS Block 1 passed a milestone known as Key Decision Point C and entered full-scale development, with an estimated launch date of November 2018.

==== EUS options ====
In 2013, NASA and Boeing analyzed the performance of several Exploration Upper Stage (EUS) engine options. The analysis was based on a second-stage usable propellant load of 105 metric tons, and compared stages with four RL10 engines, two MARC-60 engines, or one J-2X engine. In 2014, NASA also considered using the European Vinci instead of the RL10, which offered the same specific impulse but with 64% greater thrust, which would allow for the same performance at a lower cost.

In 2018, Blue Origin submitted a proposal to replace the EUS with a cheaper alternative to be designed and fabricated by the company, but it was rejected by NASA in November 2019 on multiple grounds; these included lower performance compared to the existing EUS design, incompatibility of the proposal with the height of the door of the Vehicle Assembly Building being only 390 feet (120 m), and unacceptable acceleration of Orion components such as its solar panels due to the higher thrust of the engines being used for the fuel tank.

In February 2026, NASA administrator Jared Isaacman announced the cancellation of EUS.

==== SRB tests ====
From 2009 to 2011, three full-duration static fire tests of five-segment solid rocket boosters were conducted under the Constellation Program, including tests at low and high core temperatures, to validate performance at extreme temperatures. The 5-segment solid rocket booster would be carried over to SLS. Northrop Grumman Innovation Systems has completed full-duration static fire tests of the five-segment solid rocket boosters. Qualification Motor 1 was tested on March 10, 2015. Qualification Motor 2 was successfully tested on June 28, 2016.

=== Proposed cancellation ===
On February 7, 2025, Boeing, the primary contractor for the SLS, informed its employees working on the rocket program that they may face layoffs when the company's contract expires in March. The announcement coincided with the anticipated release of the presidential budget, suggesting the Trump administration might propose canceling the SLS program.

On May 2, 2025, the Trump administration released its fiscal year 2026 budget proposal for NASA, which calls for terminating the SLS and Orion spacecraft programs after Artemis III. The budget proposal described the SLS as "grossly expensive", noting that it costs $4 billion per launch and has exceeded its budget by 140 percent. The budget allocates funding for a program to transition to "more cost-effective commercial systems", a move projected by the White House Office of Management and Budget to save NASA $879 million.

The 2025 One Big Beautiful Bill Act included funding for SLS rockets for the Artemis IV and V missions, but a clause directed NASA to evaluate alternatives to the EUS.

== Launch costs ==
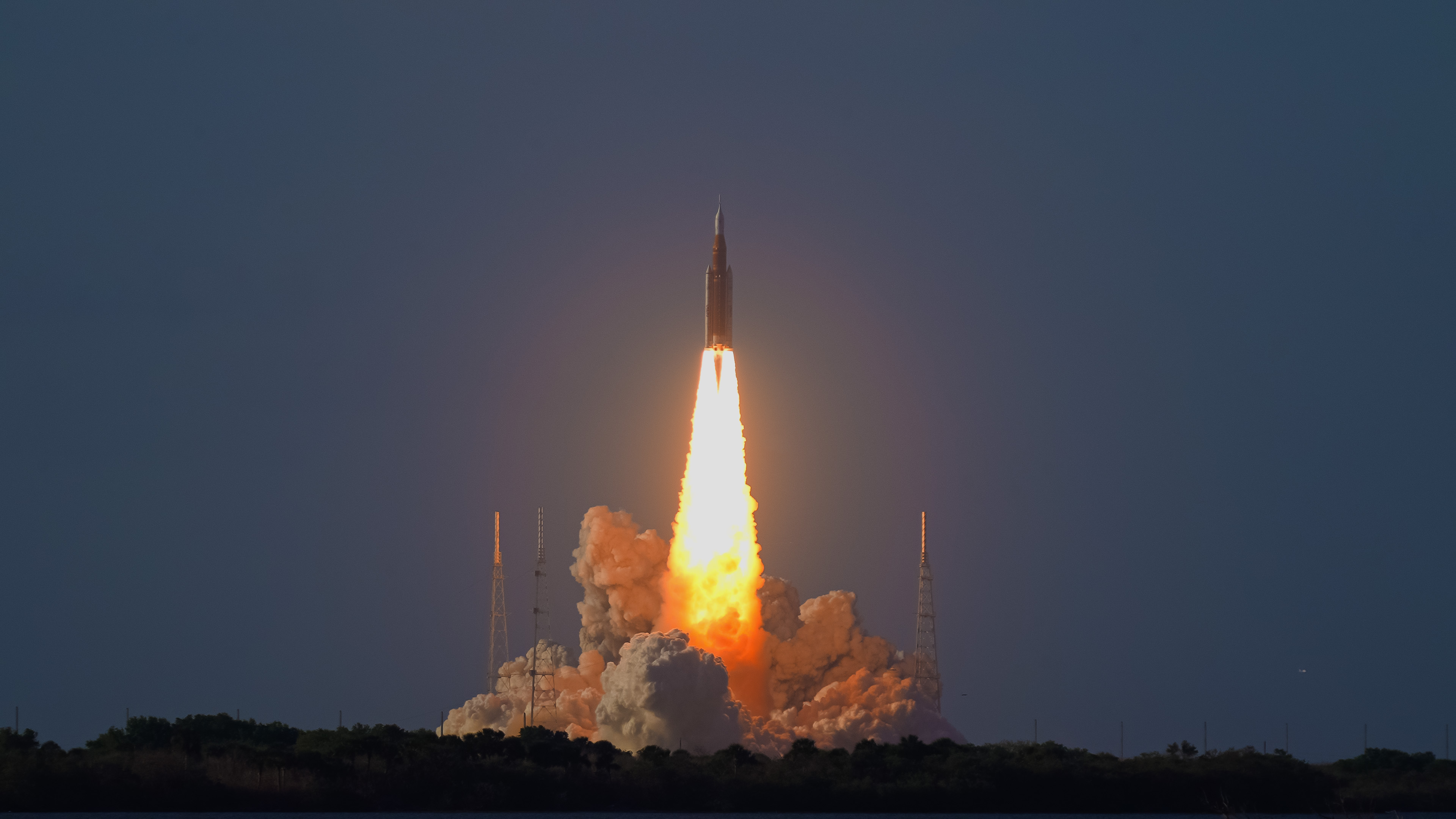
The SLS taking off for Artemis II.

NASA has been reluctant to provide an official per-flight cost estimate for the SLS. However, independent agencies, such as the White House Office of Management and Budget and the NASA Office of Inspector General, have offered their own estimates.

A White House Office of Management and Budget letter to the Senate Appropriations Committee in October 2019 estimated that SLS's total cost to the taxpayer was estimated at "over $2 billion" per launch. (Note: See the budget table for yearly inflation-adjusted figures.) When questioned by a journalist, a NASA spokesperson did not deny this per-flight cost estimate.

The NASA Office of Inspector General has conducted several audits of the SLS program. A November 2021 report estimated that, at least for the first four launches of Artemis program, the per-launch production and operating costs would be $2.2 billion for SLS, plus $568 million for Exploration Ground Systems. Additionally, the payload would cost $1 billion for Orion and $300 million for the European Service Module. An October 2023 report found that recurring production costs for SLS, excluding development and integration costs, are estimated to be at least $2.5 billion per launch. In 2025, Sean Duffy, the then acting NASA administrator, said that, "Artemis I, Artemis II, and Artemis III are all $4 billion a launch".

NASA has said that it is working with Boeing to bring down the cost of SLS launches and that a higher launch frequency could potentially lead to economies of scale, and would allow fixed costs to be spread out over more launches. However, the NASA Office of Inspector General has called NASA's cost savings goals highly unrealistic and other potential government customers have made it clear they have no interest in using SLS.

== Operation ==
=== Construction ===
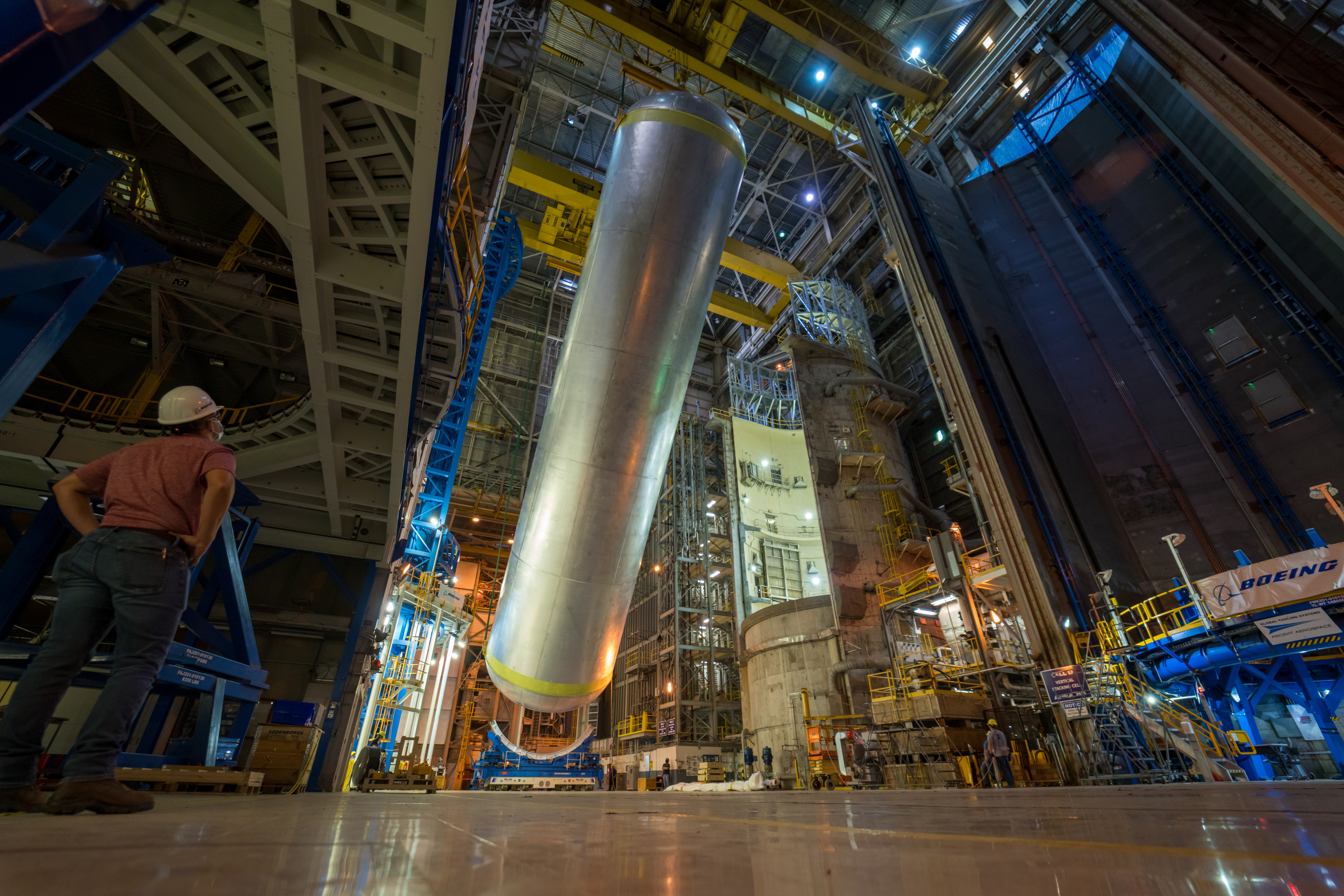
Liquid hydrogen tank for Artemis II under construction, August 2020

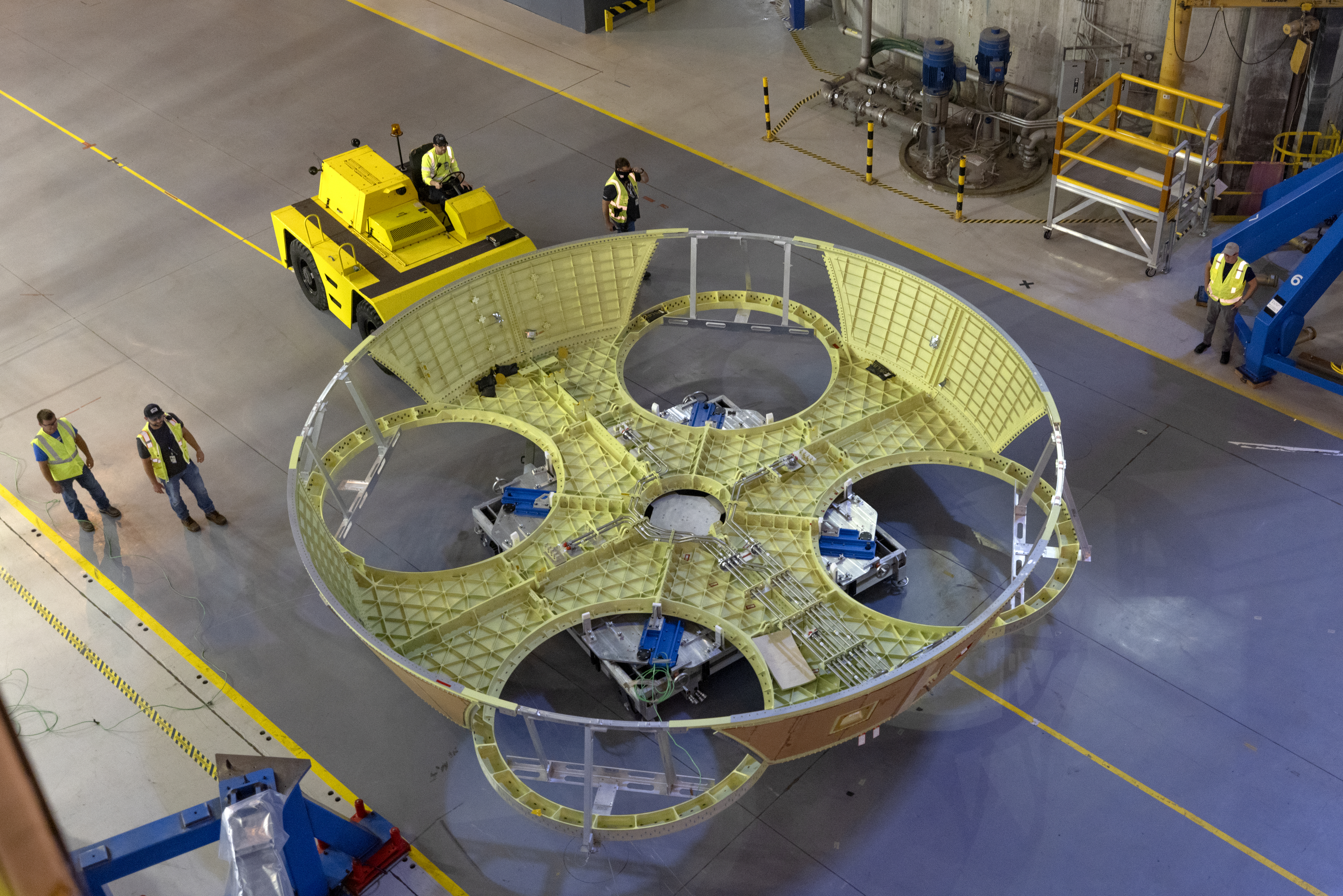
"Boat-tail" engine fairing for Artemis II under construction, June 2021

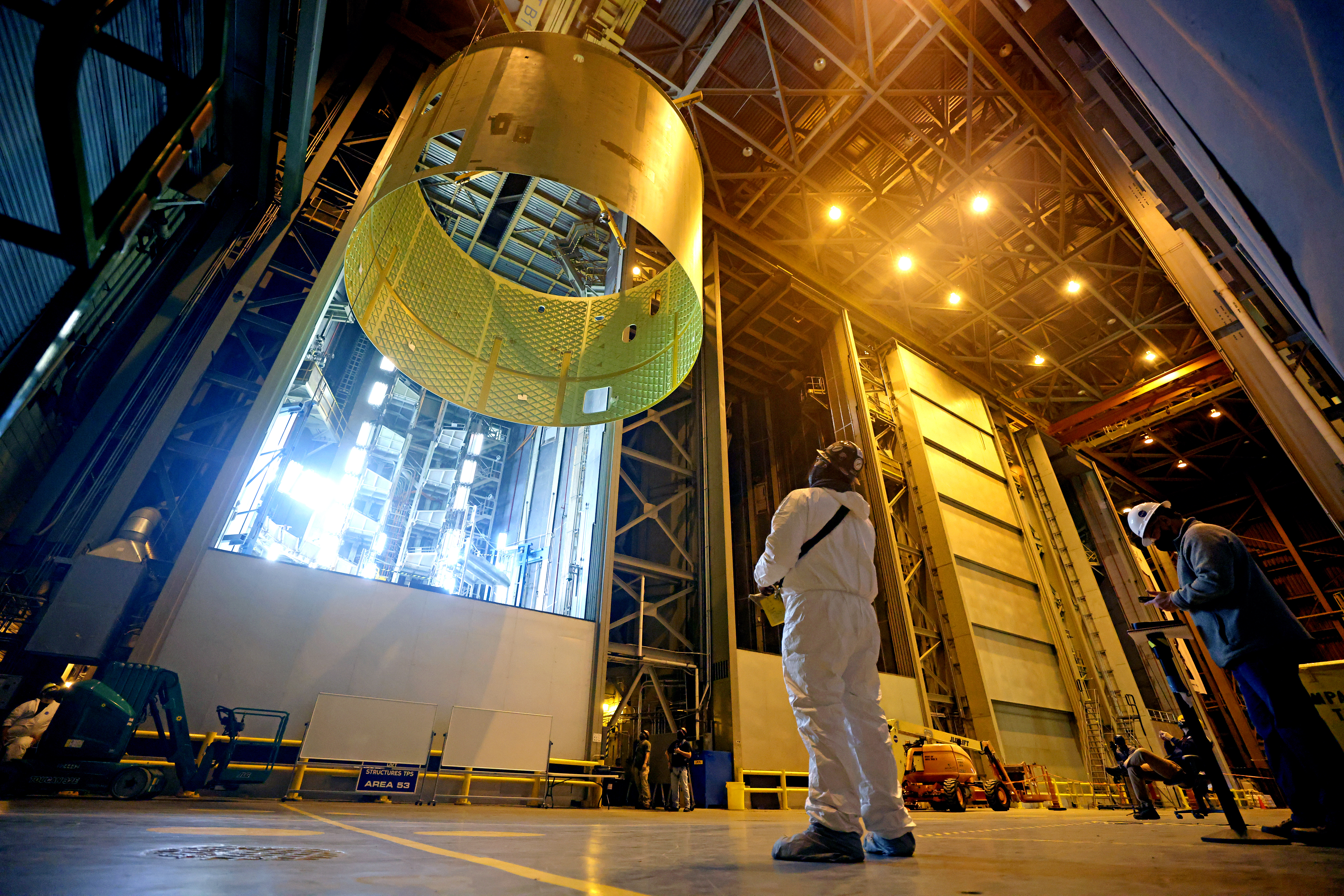
Engine section shroud structure for Artemis III under construction, April 2021

As of 2020, three SLS versions were planned: Block 1, Block 1B, and Block 2. Each would use the same core stage with its four main engines, but Block 1B will feature the Exploration Upper Stage (EUS), and Block 2 will combine the EUS with upgraded boosters.

The ICPS for Artemis 1 was delivered by ULA to NASA about July 2017 and was housed at Kennedy Space Center as of November 2018.

==== Construction of core stage ====
In mid-November 2014, construction of the first core stage hardware began using a new friction stir welding system in the South Vertical Assembly Building at NASA's Michoud Assembly Facility. Between 2015 and 2017, NASA test fired RS-25 engines in preparation for use on SLS.

The core stage for the first SLS, built at Michoud Assembly Facility by Boeing, had all four engines attached in November 2019, and it was declared finished by NASA in December 2019.

The first core stage left Michoud Assembly Facility for comprehensive testing at Stennis Space Center in January 2020. The static firing test program at Stennis Space Center, known as the Green Run, operated all the core stage systems simultaneously for the first time. Test 7 (of 8), the wet dress rehearsal, was carried out in December 2020 and the fire (test 8) took place on January 16, 2021, but shut down earlier than expected, about 67 seconds in total rather than the desired eight minutes. The reason for the early shutdown was later reported to be because of conservative test commit criteria on the thrust vector control system, specific only for ground testing and not for flight. If this scenario occurred during a flight, the rocket would have continued to fly normally. There was no sign of damage to the core stage or the engines, contrary to initial concerns.

The second fire test was completed on March 18, 2021, with all four engines igniting, throttling down as expected to simulate in-flight conditions, and gimballing profiles. The core stage was shipped to Kennedy Space Center to be mated with the rest of the rocket for Artemis I. It left Stennis on April 24 and arrived at Kennedy on April 27. It was refurbished there in preparation for stacking. On June 12, 2021, NASA announced the assembly of the first SLS rocket was completed at the Kennedy Space Center. The assembled SLS was used for the uncrewed Artemis I mission in 2022.

The first SLS, for Artemis I, launched an Orion spacecraft into a lunar orbit on a test flight in fall 2022, and NASA and Boeing are constructing the next three rockets for Artemis II, Artemis III, and Artemis IV. Boeing stated in July 2021 that while the COVID-19 pandemic had affected their suppliers and schedules, such as delaying parts needed for hydraulics, they would still be able to provide the Artemis II SLS core stage per NASA's schedule, with months to spare. The spray-on foam insulation process for Artemis II was automated for most sections of the core stage, saving 12 days in the schedule. The Artemis II forward skirt, the foremost component of the core stage, was affixed on the liquid oxygen tank in late May 2021. By September 25, 2023, the core stage was functionally complete, as all sections were assembled and the four RS-25 engines had been installed. The complete core stage was set to ship to NASA in late fall 2023, eight months later than was predicted originally. The complete core stage was delivered in July 2024. For Artemis III, assembly of elements of the thrust structure began at Michoud Assembly Facility in early 2021. By August 2025, the thrust structure was completed and moved to storage in the Vehicle Assembly Building at Kennedy, to await the rest of the stage's arrival in mid-2026. The liquid hydrogen tank for Artemis III was originally planned to be the Artemis I tank, but it was set aside as the welds were found to be faulty. Repair techniques were developed, and the tank re-entered production and will be proof tested for strength, for use on Artemis III.

=== Launches ===
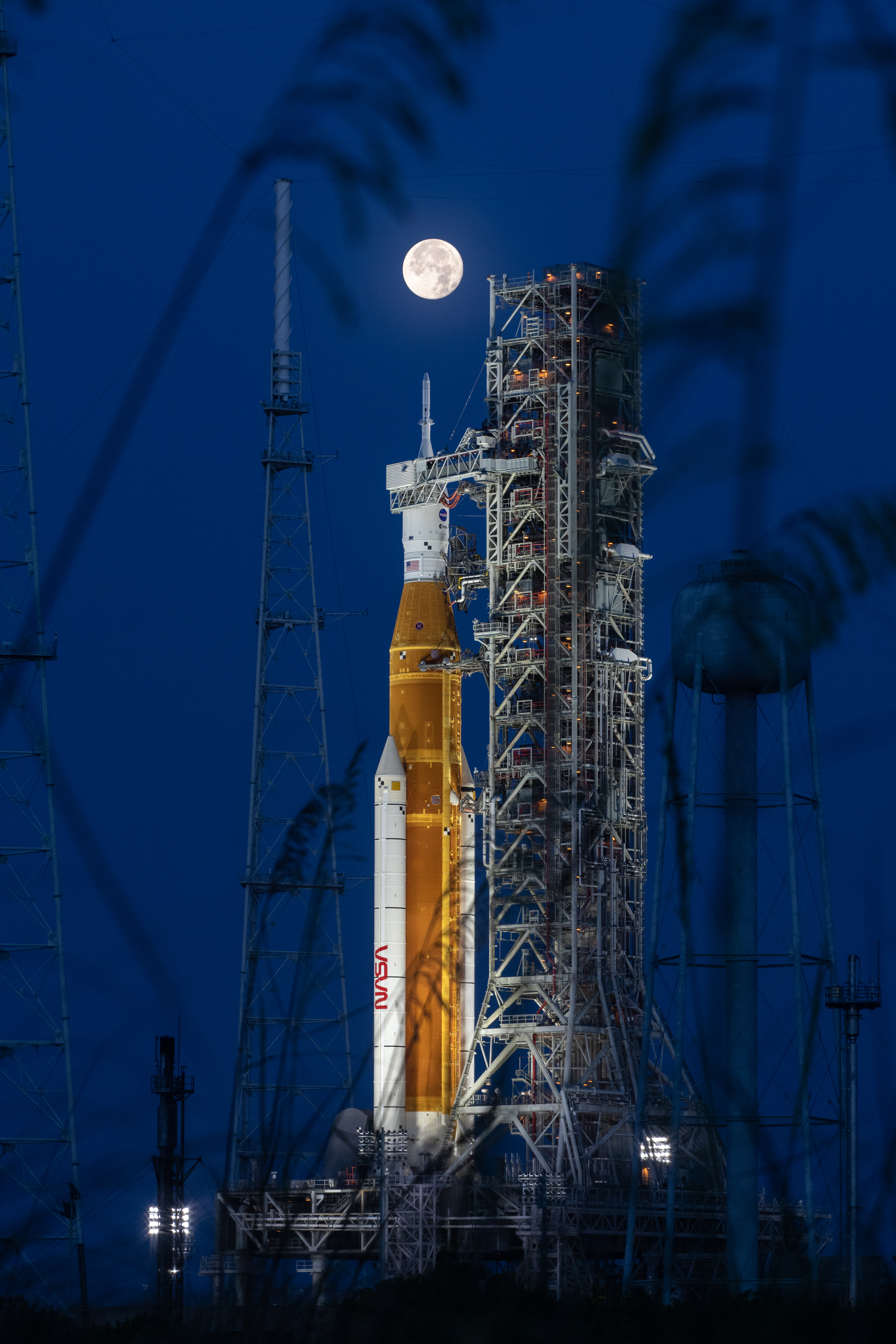
SLS of Artemis I on the launch pad with the Moon, its payload destination

Originally planned for late 2016, the uncrewed first flight of SLS slipped more than twenty-six times and almost six years. (Note: Then-planned launch date history: Date / Planned launch date for first flight; October 2010 / December 31, 2016; September 2011 / 2017; February 2012–August 2014 / December 17, 2017; December 2014 / June–July 2018; April 13, 2017 / November 2018; April 28, 2017 / 2019; November 2017 / June 2020; December 2019 / November 2020; February 21, 2020 / April 18, 2021; February 28, 2020 / Mid- to late 2021; May 2020 / November 22, 2021; August 2021 / December 2021; October 22, 2021 / February 12, 2022; December 17, 2021 / March–April 2022; February 2022 / May 2022; March 2022 / June 2022; April 26, 2022 / August 23, 2022; July 20, 2022 / 8:33 am ET (12:33 UTC), August 29, 2022; August 29, 2022 / 12:48 pm ET (16:48 UTC), September 2, 2022; August 30, 2022 / 2:17 pm ET (18:17 UTC), September 3, 2022; September 3, 2022 / September 19–October 4, 2022; September 8, 2022 / September 23–October 4, 2022; September 12, 2022 / September 27–October 4, 2022; September 24, 2022 / Late October 2022; September 30, 2022 / November 12–27, 2022; October 13, 2022 / 12:07 am ET (5:07 UTC), November 14, 2022; November 8, 2022 / 1:04 am ET (6:04 UTC), November 16, 2022) As of earlier that month, the first launch was originally scheduled for 8:30 am EDT, August 29, 2022. It was postponed to 2:17 pm EDT (18:17 UTC), September 3, after the launch director called a scrub due to a temperature sensor falsely indicating that an RS-25 engine's hydrogen bleed intake was too warm. The September 3 attempt was then scrubbed due to a hydrogen leak in the tail service mast quick disconnect arm, which was fixed; the next launch option was at first a period in late October and then a launch in mid-November, due to unfavorable weather during Hurricane Ian. It launched on November 16.

NASA originally limited the amount of time the solid rocket boosters can remain stacked to "about a year" from the time two segments are joined. The first and second segments of the Artemis I boosters were joined on January 7, 2021. NASA could choose to extend the time limit based on an engineering review. On September 29, 2021, Northrop Grumman indicated that the limit could be extended to eighteen months for Artemis I, based on an analysis of the data collected when the boosters were being stacked; an analysis weeks before the actual launch date later extended that to December 2022 for the boosters of Artemis I, almost two years after stacking.

In late 2015, the SLS program was stated to have a 70% confidence level for the first Orion flight that carries crew, the second SLS flight overall, to happen by 2023; however, the flight did not take place until 2026.

| Flight No. | Date, time (UTC) | Mission | Orbit | Outcome |
|---|---|---|---|---|
| 1 | November 16, 2022, 06:47 | Artemis I | Selenocentric (DRO) | Success |
| 1 | Uncrewed maiden flight of the SLS, first operational flight of the Orion spacecraft and European Service Module. Carrying cubesats for ten missions in the CubeSat Launch Initiative (CSLI), and three missions in the Cube Quest Challenge: ArgoMoon, BioSentinel, CuSP, EQUULEUS, LunaH-Map, Lunar IceCube, LunIR, NEA Scout, OMOTENASHI and Team Miles. The payloads were sent on a trans-lunar injection trajectory. | | | |
| 2 | April 1, 2026, 22:35 | Artemis II | Circumlunar (fly-by) | Success |
| 2 | First crewed lunar mission since Apollo 17 in 1972. Conducted a flyby of the Moon, breaking the record for the furthest human distance from Earth. Carried four CSLI payloads: TACHELES, ATENEA, K-RadCube, and SHAMS. | | | |
| 3 | Late 2027 | Artemis III | LEO | Planned |
| 3 | Crewed rendezvous and docking tests with one or both lunar landers launched separately—SpaceX's Starship HLS and Blue Origin's Blue Moon—as well as tests of the Exploration Extravehicular Mobility Unit (xEMU) space suit. Will fly without an upper stage. | | | |
| 4 | Early 2028 | Artemis IV | Selenocentric | Planned |
| 4 | First crewed lunar landing mission since Apollo 17. | | | |
| 5 | Late 2028 | Artemis V | Selenocentric | Planned |
| 5 | Second planned crewed lunar landing mission. Initial construction of Moon base to begin. Expected to be first use of Centaur V upper stage with SLS. | | | |

==== Usage beyond Artemis ====
Efforts have been made to expand the Artemis missions to launching NASA's robotic space probes and observatories. However, SLS program officials have noted that between the launch cadence of Artemis missions and supply chain constraints, it is unlikely that rockets could be built to support science missions before the late 2020s or early 2030s.

Another challenge is that the large solid-rocket boosters produce significant vibrations, which can damage sensitive scientific instruments. During wind-tunnel testing, torsional load values (a measurement of twisting and vibration) were nearly double initial estimates. Although program officials later acknowledged the issue, they expressed confidence in their ability to mitigate it.

As of October 2024, NASA has studied using SLS for Neptune Odyssey, Europa Lander, Enceladus Orbilander, Persephone, HabEx, Origins Space Telescope, LUVOIR, Lynx, and Interstellar probe.

Initially, Congress mandated that NASA use the SLS to launch the Europa Clipper probe. However, concerns about the SLS's availability led NASA to seek congressional approval for competitive launch bids. SpaceX ultimately won the contract, saving the agency an estimated US$2 billion in direct launch costs over SLS, albeit at the cost of a longer flight.

After the launch of Artemis IV, NASA plans to transfer production and launch operations of SLS to Deep Space Transport LLC, a joint venture between Boeing and Northrop Grumman. The agency hopes the companies can find more buyers for flights on the rocket to bring costs per flight down to $1 billion. However, finding a market for the large and costly rocket will be difficult. Reuters reported that the US Department of Defense, long considered a potential customer, stated in 2023 that it has no interest in the rocket as other launch vehicles already offer them the capability that they need at an affordable price.

== Criticism ==
The SLS has been criticized based on program cost, lack of commercial involvement, and non-competitiveness caused by legislation requiring the use of Space Shuttle components "where possible".

=== Funding ===
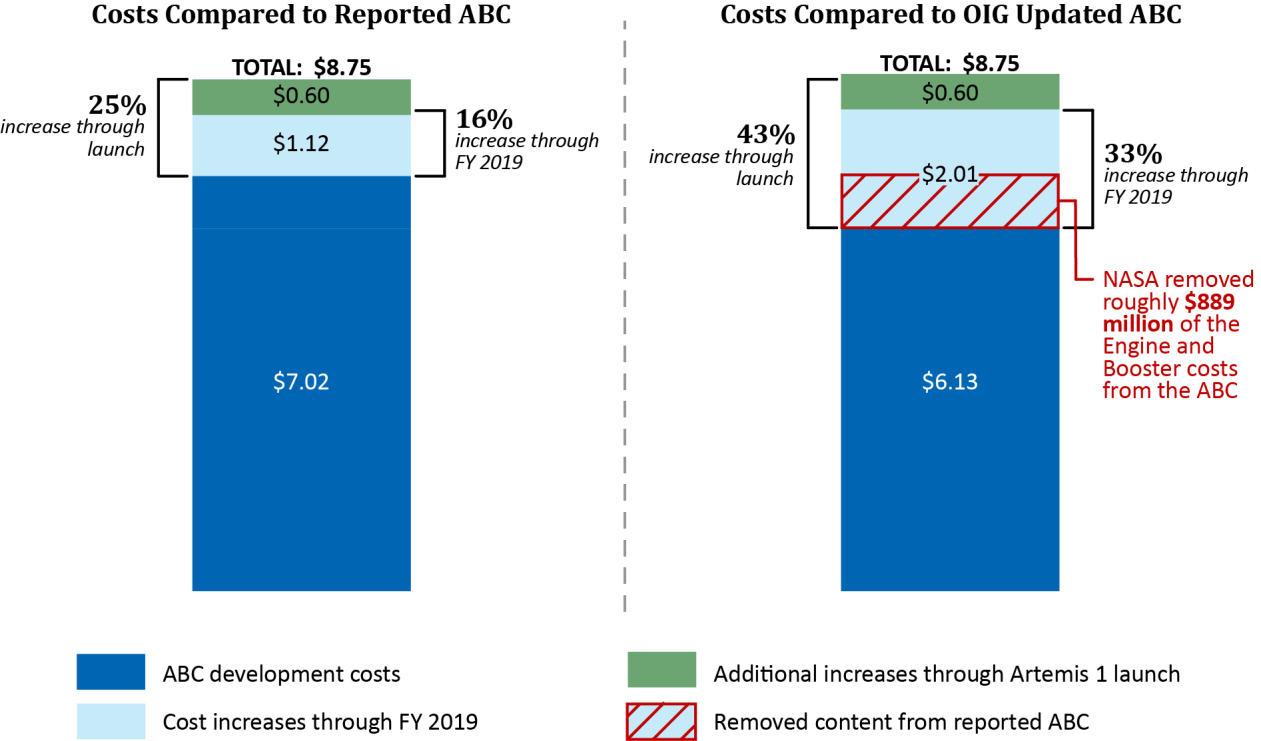
Visual from the March 2020 Inspector General report, showing how NASA used accounting to "mask" a cost increase by moving the boosters (which cost $889 million) from the SLS to another cost center, without updating the SLS budget to match

As the Space Shuttle program drew to a close in 2009, the Obama administration convened the Augustine Commission to assess NASA's future human spaceflight endeavors. The commission's findings were stark: NASA's proposed Ares V rocket, intended for lunar and Martian missions, was unsustainable and should be canceled. The administration further advocated for a public-private partnership, where private companies would develop and operate spacecraft, and NASA would purchase launch services on a fixed-cost basis.

The recommendations faced fierce opposition from senators representing states with significant aerospace industries. In response, in 2011, Congress mandated the development of the SLS. The program was characterized by a complex web of political compromises, ensuring that various regions and interests benefited, maintaining jobs and contracts for existing space shuttle contractors. Utah Senator Orrin Hatch ensured the new rocket used the Shuttle's solid boosters, which were manufactured in his state. Alabama Senator Richard Shelby insisted that the Marshall Space Flight Center design and test the rocket. Florida Senator Bill Nelson brought home billions of dollars to Kennedy Space Center to modernize its launch facilities.

Almost immediately, Representative Tom McClintock called on the Government Accountability Office to investigate possible violations of the Competition in Contracting Act, arguing that the requirement that Shuttle components be used on SLS were non-competitive and assured contracts to existing suppliers.

The Obama administration's 2014 budget called for canceling SLS and turning over space transportation to commercial companies. The White House sent Lori Garver, the NASA deputy administrator, along with astronaut Sally Ride and other experts to defend the proposal, saying the SLS program was too slow and wasteful. However, Senators Shelby and Nelson quickly moved to fight efforts to cut the program and were ultimately victorious. After retirement from NASA, Garver would go on to recommend cancellation of the SLS.

During the First Trump administration, NASA administrator Jim Bridenstine suggested to a Senate committee that the agency was considering using the Falcon Heavy or Delta IV Heavy rocket to launch Orion instead of SLS. Afterward, the administrator was reportedly called into a meeting with Senator Shelby, who told Bridenstine he should resign for making the suggestion in a public meeting.

In 2023, Cristina Chaplain, former assistant director of the GAO, expressed doubts about reducing the rocket's cost to a competitive threshold, "just given the history and how challenging it is to build."

=== Management ===
In 2019, the Government Accountability Office (GAO) noted that NASA had assessed the performance of contractor Boeing positively, though the project had experienced cost growth and delay. A March 2020 report by Office of Inspector General found NASA moved out $889 million of costs relating to SLS boosters, but did not update the SLS budget to match. This kept the budget overrun to 15% in FY 2019; an overrun of 30% would have required NASA to request additional funding from the U.S. Congress The Inspector General report found that were it not for this "masking" of cost, the overrun would have been 33% by FY 2019. The GAO stated "NASA's current approach for reporting cost growth misrepresents the cost performance of the program".

=== Proposed alternatives ===
In 2009, the Augustine commission proposed a commercial 165,000 lb (75 t) launcher for lunar exploration. In 2011–2012, the Space Access Society, Space Frontier Foundation, and The Planetary Society called for the cancellation of the project, arguing that the SLS would consume the funds for other projects from the NASA budget. U.S. Representative Dana Rohrabacher and others proposed the development of an orbital propellant depot and the acceleration of the Commercial Crew Development program as an alternative to the SLS program.

An unpublished NASA study and another from the Georgia Institute of Technology found these approaches could have lower costs. In 2012, United Launch Alliance also suggested using existing rockets with on-orbit assembly and propellant depots as needed. In 2019, a former ULA employee alleged that Boeing viewed orbital refueling technology as a threat to the SLS and blocked investment in the technology. In 2010, SpaceX's CEO Elon Musk claimed that his company could build a launch vehicle in the 310,000–330,000 lb (140–150 t) payload range for $2.5 billion, or $300 million (in 2010 dollars) per launch, not including a potential upper-stage upgrade.

Former NASA Administrator Charlie Bolden, expressed that the SLS could be replaced in the future in an interview with Politico in September 2020. Bolden said that the "SLS will go away ... because at some point commercial entities are going to catch up." Bolden further stated, "They are really going to build a heavy-lift launch vehicle sort of like SLS that they will be able to fly for a much cheaper price than NASA can do SLS. That's just the way it works."

Shortly after the New Glenn 9×4 rocket variant was announced in November 2025, journalist Eric Berger noted that it would offer lift capacity approaching that of the SLS Block 1 while retaining a reusable first stage and a larger payload fairing, and could cost less than one-tenth as much per launch.

== See also ==
- Austere Human Missions to Mars
- Comparison of orbital launch systems
- Criticism of the Space Shuttle program
- DIRECT, proposals prior to SLS
- Shuttle-Derived Heavy Lift Launch Vehicle, a 2009 concept launch vehicle
- Ares V, a 2000s cargo vehicle design for the Constellation Program
- National Launch System, 1990s
- Saturn rocket family, 1960s
- Starship HLS, lunar variant of super heavy-lift vehicle Starship
- Studied Space Shuttle Variations and Derivatives
