= ATENEA (satellite) =

Argentine deep-space cubesat

- Operator: National Space Activities Commission

Spacecraft properties
- Bus: 12U CubeSat
- Manufacturer: National University of La Plata and CONAE

Start of mission
- Launch date: April 1, 2026, 22:35:00 UTC (6:35 pm EDT)
- Rocket: Space Launch System
- Launch site: LC-39B
- Contractor: NASA

End of mission
- Decay date: April 5, 2026, ~1:00:00 UTC (April 4, 2026, ~9:00 pm EDT)

Orbital parameters
- Reference system: Geocentric
- Regime: High Earth orbit
- ATENEA's mission patch Artemis Program

ATENEA was a 12U CubeSat developed by the National University of La Plata and Argentina's National Space Activities Commission (CONAE) as a secondary payload on NASA's Artemis II mission. The main objectives of ATENEA were to test long-range communications, collect GPS data above the GPS constellation, and measure space radiation and its effects on electronic components.

== Background ==
ATENEA was one of four CubeSats picked from proposals by 50 different countries for the Artemis II mission, and was the only one from a Latin American country. The satellite was developed by the National Space Activities Commission (CONAE), the Argentine national space program with the collaboration of La Plata University, University of Buenos Aires, CNEA, University of San Martin, the Argentinian Institute of Radioastronomy, and Veng. The probe was named after Athena the Greek goddess of wisdom to demonstrate the satellite's pursuit of scientific knowledge, and the meticulous planning that went into its construction. CONAE also hopes that the experience of building ATENEA will lead to further investments into Argentina's satellite manufacturing capabilities.

== Mission ==
ATENEA traveled roughly 44,739 miles (72,000 kilometers) above the earth, well above the planet's magnetic field in order to study radiation exposure. ATENEAs secondary mission was to test if faint signals from Earth's GPS satellites can be used to navigate far from the planet with a significant degree of accuracy, as opposed to using astronavigation. Other missions included testing silicon photomultipliers developed by the National University of General San Martín, and an experimental long-range communication link developed by the National University of La Plata.

Due to the nature of the Artemis' orbit, with its periapsis still within the atmosphere, and the fact ATENEA did not have a propulsion system, it would not complete an orbit and instead was designed burn up in the atmosphere around 14 hours after being released giving the craft an expected 12 hour contact window. On Thursday, April 2, CONAE reported that ATENEA had reached its apoapsis of 70,000 km, setting the record for the furthest distance by an Argentine probe from Earth at around 9 AM local time, after having established contact at 2 AM. The probe returned signals for 20 hours before burning up in Earth's atmosphere at around 1:00 AM UTC on April 5, 2026.

== Aftermath ==
Argentina's President Javier Milei praised the ATENEA as efficient science spending, having previously been very critical of CONAE, and slashing the agency's budget by 57% in 2025, and an additional 30% in 2026 while he also cancelled the Tronador and SAOCOM 2 programs.

== See also ==
- Artemis II
- Tacheles (satellite)
- K-RadCube
- Space Weather CubeSat-1
