= Berlin Partner for Business and Technology =

Public–private economic development agency in Berlin

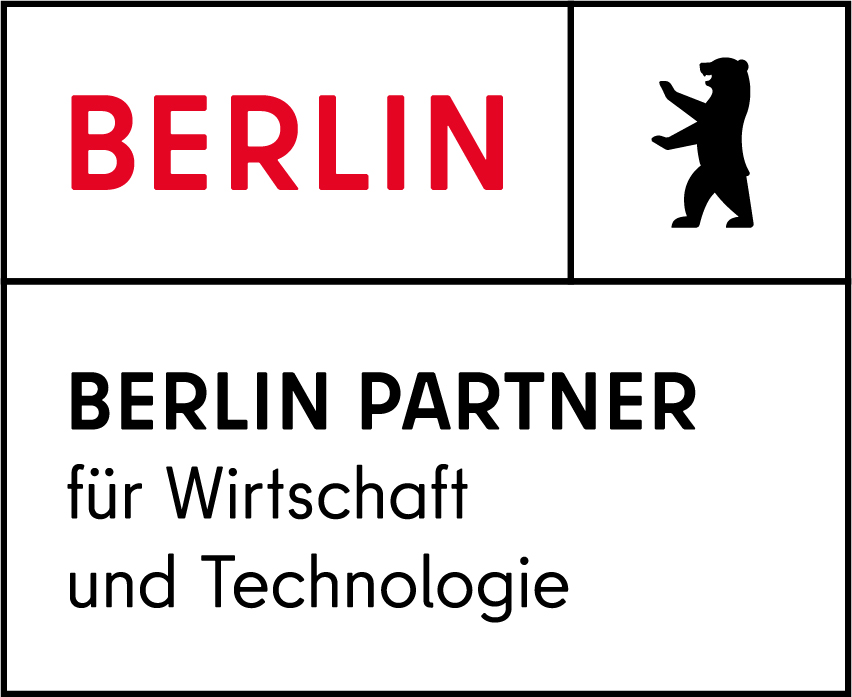
- Native name: Berlin Partner für Wirtschaft und Technologie GmbH
- Type: Public–private partnership (GmbH)
- Industry: Economic development, investment promotion, city marketing
- Founded: 1994 (as Partner für Berlin GmbH)
- Headquarters: Fasanenstraße 85, 10623 Berlin, Germany
- Key people: Stefan Franzke (Managing Director)
- Number of employees: ~200
- Website: www.berlin-partner.de

Berlin Partner for Business and Technology (German: Berlin Partner für Wirtschaft und Technologie GmbH) is the state-mandated economic development and innovation promotion agency for the city and state of Berlin, Germany. It markets Berlin internationally, assists companies and investors in relocating or expanding, fosters networks among business, research and government, and spearheads cluster initiatives, including in the healthcare/life sciences sector under the HealthCapital Berlin-Brandenburg program.

== History ==
The organization's origins dates to 1994, when Partner für Berlin GmbH was established to promote Berlin as a business location. In 2013, Berlin's economic development and technology-promotion functions were consolidated into the current Berlin Partner für Wirtschaft und Technologie GmbH. In June 2024, Berlin Partner marked its 30 year anniversary with a celebration at Holzmarkt in Friedrichshain attended by city leaders and industry figures.

== Organization and mandate ==
Berlin Partner is the state's dedicated economic development agency, operating as a public–private partnership mandated and funded by the State of Berlin. It collaborates with Berlin's chambers, associations and private partners to promote investment, innovation and growth in the capital region.

The Berlin Partner network comprises more than 250 corporate, academic and institutional partners. Around 200 employees work at the agency’s offices in the Ludwig-Erhard-Haus (Charlottenburg), which also houses the Berlin Chamber of Industry and Commerce (IHK Berlin).

== Activities ==
Berlin Partner's portfolio spans:

- Investor and company services (site selection, real estate, funding, permitting, talent & relocation support).
- Cluster and innovation programs in sectors such as mobility, digital economy, industrial production, and healthcare & life sciences.
- Marketing and branding of Berlin as a business location, including via the Business Location Center (BLC).
- Health and life sciences cluster activities under the HealthCapital Berlin-Brandenburg umbrella, connecting hospitals, research institutes and companies, and coordinating joint stands at major events (e.g. DMEA).
- Cross-agency and European cooperation initiatives, including participation in the multi-city investment-promotion campaign "Choose Europe".

=== Healthcare / Life Sciences (HealthCapital) ===
The HealthCapital Berlin-Brandenburg initiative is a regional brand for the healthcare and life-sciences sector. Berlin Partner coordinates cluster activities, joint exhibitor stands at digital health events (e.g. DMEA), and networking between hospitals, biotech and medtech firms, and researchers. In March 2025, press reports highlighted that health and medical technologies were among the sectors receiving increased promotion and investment support in Berlin. Since 2022, Prof. Dr. Heyo Kroemer, Chief Executive Officer of Charité – Universitätsmedizin Berlin, has served as spokesperson of the HealthCapital Berlin-Brandenburg cluster.

BarCamp Health-IT / Barcamp Health Innovation. Berlin Partner's cluster management launched the BarCamp Health-IT format in 2012 to connect the healthcare and IT sectors; by 2017 the event was held for the sixth time, themed "IoT in der Medizin", at medical-technology firm Karl Storz. The series broadened in 2024 under the name "Barcamp Health Innovation", with a focus on the patient journey and participation from industry and insurers; subsequent edition continued in 2025 at the IBM iX Experience Agency of IBM Consulting in Berlin.

== Gallery ==
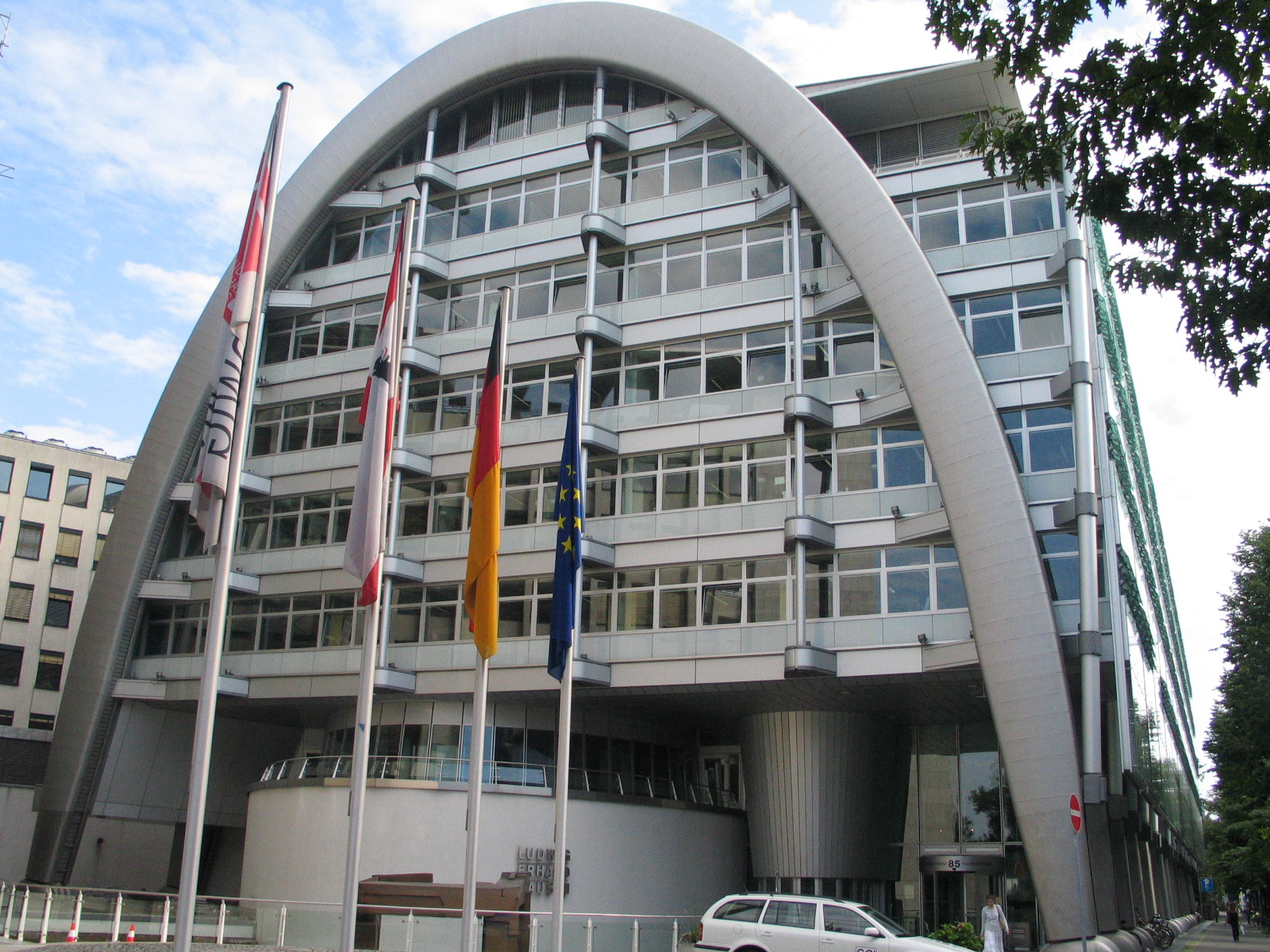
Ludwig-Erhard-Haus (exterior), where Berlin Partner is located

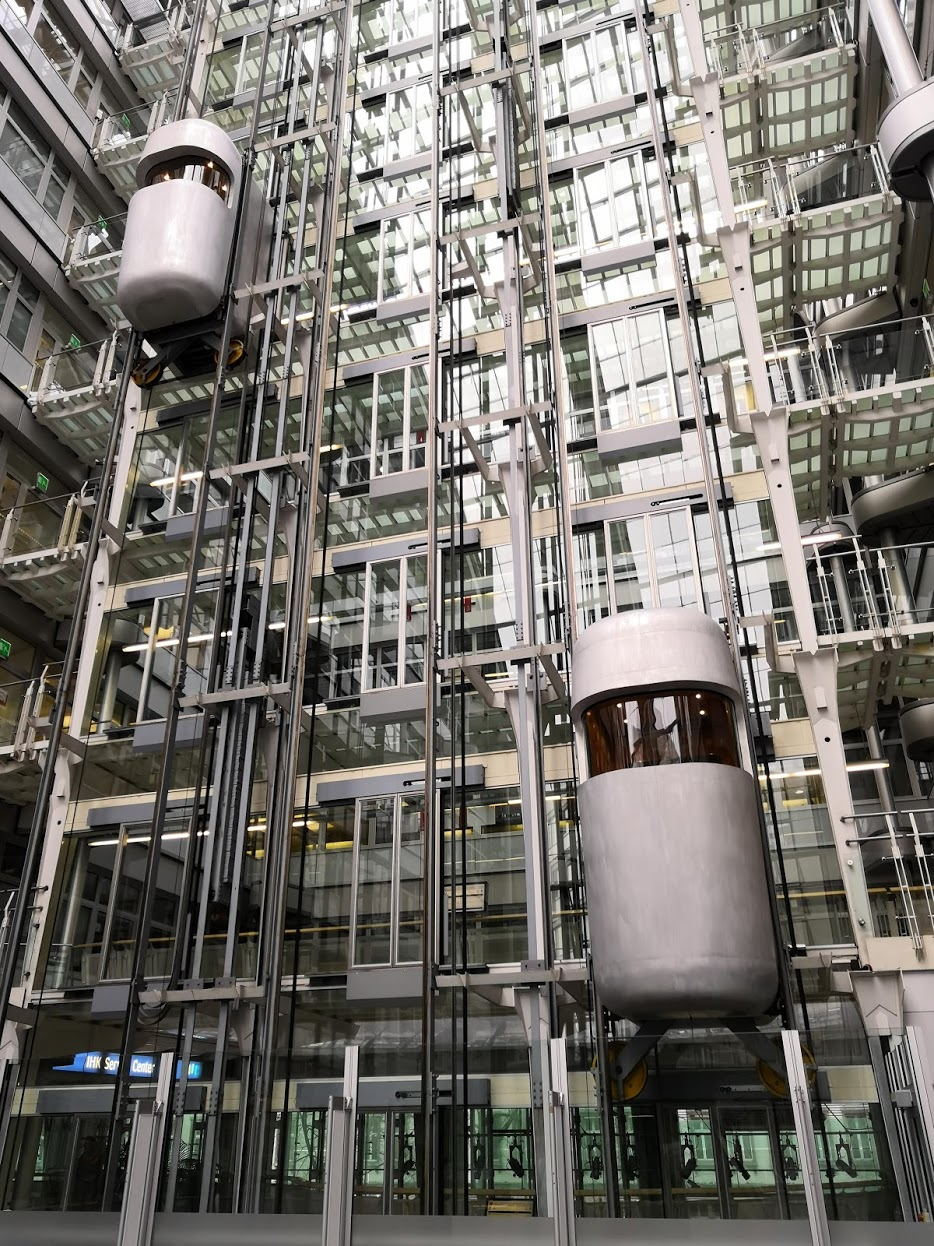
Interior view of the Ludwig-Erhard-Haus
