= Team Miles =

US experimental communications and plasma propulsion spacecraft

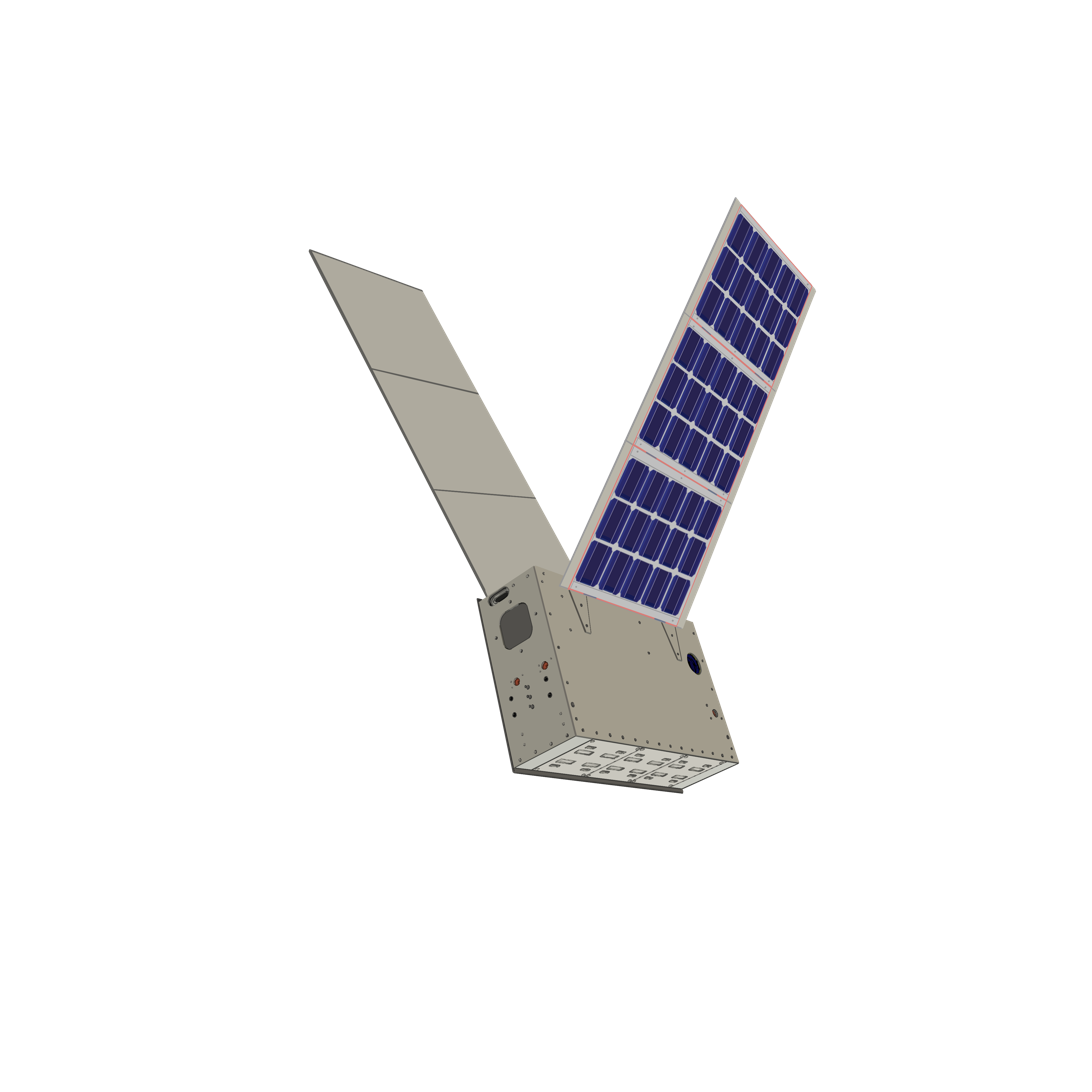
- Mission type: Technology demonstration
- Website: team.miles-space.com

Spacecraft properties
- Spacecraft: Team Miles
- Spacecraft type: CubeSat
- Bus: 6U CubeSat
- Manufacturer: Fluid and Reason, LLC.
- Launch mass: 14 kg (31 lb)
- Dimensions: 10 cm × 20 cm × 30 cm

Start of mission
- Launch date: 16 November 2022, 06:47:44 UTC
- Rocket: SLS Block 1
- Launch site: KSC, LC-39B
- Contractor: NASA

Orbital parameters
- Reference system: Heliocentric orbit

Flyby of Moon

Transponders
- Band: S-band
- NASA CubeQuest Challenge

Team Miles was a 6U CubeSat that was to demonstrate navigation in deep space using innovative plasma thrusters. It was also to test a software-defined radio operating in the S-band for communications from about 4 million kilometers from Earth. Team Miles was one of ten CubeSats launched with the Artemis 1 mission into a heliocentric orbit in cislunar space on the maiden flight of the Space Launch System (SLS), that took place on 16 November 2022. Team Miles was deployed but contact was not established with the spacecraft.

== Overview ==
Parameter	Units/performance
Thrust	5 mN
Specific impulse (I_{sp})	760 seconds
Impulse	7456 N seconds
Power	22 watts
Wet mass	1.5 kg
Propellant mass	1 kg
Propellant	Solid iodine
Thrust:Mass	3.3 mN/kg
Impulse:Power	338 N seconds/watt
Delta-V 12 kg craft	649 m/s

The spacecraft, a 6-Unit CubeSat — measuring 10 cm × 20 cm × 30 cm — was designed and is being developed by a non-profit group of fifteen citizen scientists and engineers (Fluid and Reason, LLC) based at Tampa, Florida. Since the Team Miles won the first place at CubeQuest Challenge for the selection process, Fluid and Reason, LLC struck partnerships and became Miles Space, a commercial endeavor to further develop the technology and intellectual property that has come out of the design process.

== Propulsion ==
Wesley Faler, who leads Fluid and Reason, LLC., is the inventor of the ion thruster to be used, which he calls ConstantQ Model H. It is a form of electric propulsion for spacecraft. The engine is a hybrid plasma and laser thruster that uses ionized iodine as propellant. The Model H system includes 4 thruster heads which are canted, allowing for both primary propulsion and attitude control (orientation) without the use of moving parts. The goal within the CubeQuest Challenge is to travel 4 million kilometers, but the team will attempt to go as far as 96 million kilometers before the end of the mission.

== Radio ==
The spacecraft will use the USRP B200mini, a software-defined radio operating in the S band for communications from about 4 million kilometers from Earth.

== See also ==
The 10 CubeSats flying in the Artemis 1 mission

- Near-Earth Asteroid Scout by NASA was a solar sail spacecraft that was planned to encounter a near-Earth asteroid (mission failure)
- BioSentinel is an astrobiology mission
- LunIR by Lockheed Martin Space
- Lunar IceCube, by the Morehead State University
- CubeSat for Solar Particles (CuSP)
- Lunar Polar Hydrogen Mapper (LunaH-Map), designed by the Arizona State University
- EQUULEUS, submitted by JAXA and the University of Tokyo
- OMOTENASHI, submitted by JAXA, was a lunar lander (mission failure)
- ArgoMoon, designed by Argotec and coordinated by Italian Space Agency (ASI)
- Team Miles, by Fluid and Reason LLC, Tampa, Florida

The 3 CubeSat missions removed from Artemis 1

- Lunar Flashlight will map exposed water ice on the Moon
- Cislunar Explorers, Cornell University, Ithaca, New York
- Earth Escape Explorer (CU-E^{3}), University of Colorado Boulder
