= Cislunar Explorers =

Pair of spacecraft

- Mission type: Technology demonstration
- Operator: Cornell University

Spacecraft properties
- Spacecraft: Cislunar Explorers
- Spacecraft type: CubeSat
- Bus: 6U CubeSat
- Manufacturer: Cornell University
- Launch mass: 14 kg (31 lb)
- Dimensions: 10 cm × 20 cm × 30 cm

Start of mission
- Launch date: NET Unknown (planned)

Orbital parameters
- Reference system: Selenocentric orbit

Moon orbiter

Instruments
- Commercial cameras
- NASA CubeQuest Challenge

Cislunar Explorers is a pair of spacecraft that will show the viability of water electrolysis propulsion and interplanetary optical navigation to orbit the Moon. Both spacecraft will launch mated together as two L-shaped 3U CubeSats, which fit together as a 6U CubeSat of about 10 cm × 20 cm × 30 cm.

The technology demonstrator spacecraft pair is being developed at Cornell University in New York, by a team of researchers, graduate students, and undergraduates. The spacecraft were originally intended to launch onboard the Artemis 1 mission into a heliocentric orbit in cislunar space in 2022; delays caused by difficulties during integration led to their removal from the Artemis 1 manifest; a new launch provider has not yet been chosen.

== Water powered ==
The two spacecraft feature an unusual water electrolysis propulsion system that splits the bond between hydrogen and oxygen, producing combustible gaseous mixture that can be used as engine propellant. This propulsion system will be used to enter lunar orbit. The mission designers comment that if this water-based propulsion technology is successful, it may enable in situ resources for refueling landers for commercial or science purposes. Such a spacecraft could refuel at space-bound water sources, like asteroids, instead of bringing all the needed fuel along with it from Earth.

== Optical navigation ==
Since the purpose of the Cislunar Explorers is to test a novel propulsion system, they will simply be injected in "any lunar orbit" and maintain it for as long as possible. Cislunar Explorers will navigate completely autonomously, with minimal control from Earth. Cislunar Explorers will each use commercial cameras that enable them to view the Earth, the Moon, and the Sun. By computing the sizes of each of these objects and their locations relative to one another, the two spacecraft will deduce their locations.

== See also ==
The 10 CubeSats flying in the Artemis 1 mission

- Near-Earth Asteroid Scout by NASA is a solar sail spacecraft that will encounter a near-Earth asteroid
- BioSentinel is an astrobiology mission
- LunIR by Lockheed Martin Space
- Lunar IceCube, by the Morehead State University
- CubeSat for Solar Particles (CuSP)
- Lunar Polar Hydrogen Mapper (LunaH-Map), designed by the Arizona State University
- EQUULEUS, submitted by JAXA and the University of Tokyo
- OMOTENASHI, submitted by JAXA, was a lunar lander (mission failure)
- ArgoMoon, designed by Argotec and coordinated by Italian Space Agency (ASI)
- Team Miles, by Fluid and Reason LLC, Tampa, Florida

The 3 CubeSat missions removed from Artemis 1

- Lunar Flashlight will map exposed water ice on the Moon
- Cislunar Explorers, Cornell University, Ithaca, New York
- Earth Escape Explorer (CU-E^{3}), University of Colorado Boulder

Other water-based propelled spacecraft

- Pathfinder Technology Demonstrator
- World Is Not Enough (spacecraft propulsion)
