= ArgoMoon =

NASA/ASI cubesat

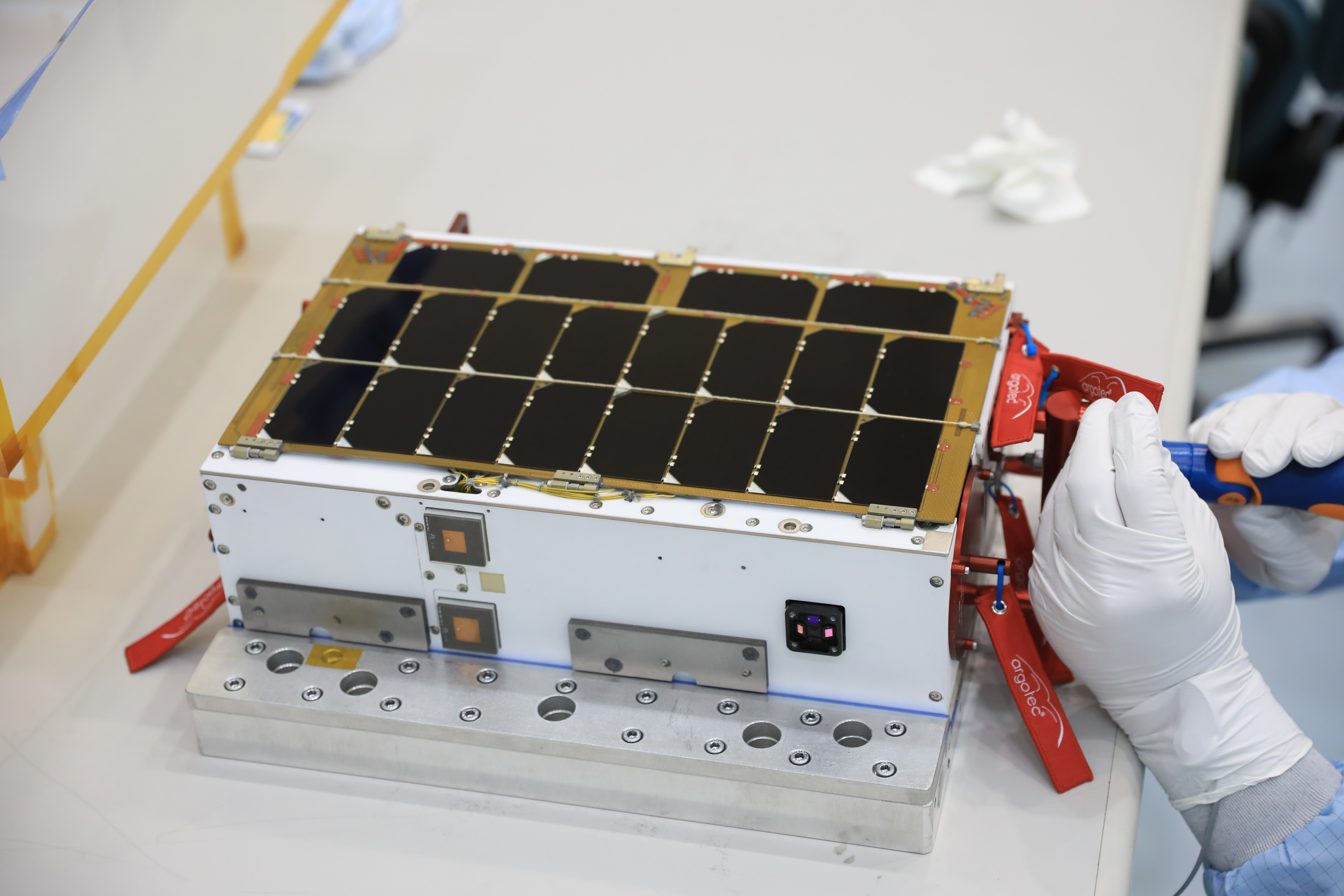
- Prelaunch processing of ArgoMoon spacecraft
- Mission type: Technology
- Operator: ASI / NASA
- COSPAR ID: 2022-156G
- SATCAT no.: 55907
- Mission duration: 10 months and 28 days

Spacecraft properties
- Spacecraft: ArgoMoon
- Spacecraft type: CubeSat
- Bus: 6U CubeSat
- Manufacturer: Argotec
- Payload mass: 14 kg (31 lb)
- Dimensions: 12 cm x 24 cm x 36 cm

Start of mission
- Launch date: 16 November 2022, 06:47:44 UTC
- Rocket: SLS Block 1
- Launch site: Kennedy Space Center, LC-39B
- Contractor: NASA

End of mission
- Disposal: Decommissioned
- Declared: 17 March 2023
- Last contact: 14 October 2023

Orbital parameters
- Reference system: Heliocentric orbit

ArgoMoon is a CubeSat that was launched into a heliocentric orbit on Artemis 1, the maiden flight of the Space Launch System, on 16 November 2022 at 06:47:44 UTC. The objective of the ArgoMoon spacecraft is to take detailed images of the Interim Cryogenic Propulsion Stage following Orion separation, an operation that will demonstrate the ability of a cubesat to conduct precise proximity maneuvers in deep space. ASI has not confirmed nor denied whether this took place, but several images of the Earth and the Moon were taken.

ArgoMoon completed its operations using proprietary software for autonomous navigation on 17 March 2023, however it remained in contact with Earth until October that year. The spacecraft also demonstrated long-distance optical communication with Earth.

== History ==
The Orion spacecraft is the primary payload of Artemis 1. The main focus of the Artemis 1 mission is demonstrating SLS and Orion operations, however the absence of cargo allowed for the opportunity to launch several low-mass cubesats along with Orion as secondary payloads.

In September 2015, NASA opened an invitation for proposals of 6U cubesats to be launched as part of the mission. Among the proposals evaluated by the Italian Space Agency (ASI), the European Space Agency (ESA), and finally NASA, the Argotec proposal was one of the selected spacecraft. ArgoMoon will be the only European satellite to participate in the mission.

The mission was declared complete in 17 March 2023, however it continued to operate until it lost contact on 14 October 2023, roughly 332 days after launch.

== Objectives ==
Argotec engineers noticed the inability of the Interim Cryogenic Propulsion Stage to send telemetry during the CubeSat deployment phase, which occurs a few hours after the separation of the Orion spacecraft. It was this issue that triggered Argotec to propose a satellite capable of performing a proximity flight with the ICPS, able to take photographs and provide an inspection to confirm the success of CubeSat deployment.

Before being injected into a heliocentric orbit because of the lunar flyby, ArgoMoon will perform a propulsive maneuver to close in a geocentric orbit. The second part of the mission will last a few months up to the natural decay of the satellite. During these months, the satellite will collect telemetry validating the nanotechnology on board the platform in the hostile environment of deep space. Up to now, CubeSats were mainly targeted to Earth observation missions, where the satellite are naturally shielded from radiation by the Earth's magnetic field.

== Satellite configuration ==
ArgoMoon will have a hybrid propulsion system, monopropellant and cold gas thrusters, to provide attitude control (orientation) and orbital maneuvering. LMP-103S monopropellant is based on ammonium dinitramide. Cold gas thrusters use R-134a hydrofluorocarbon.

- Primary propulsion: for orbit maintenance during the proximity flight and for a change of the orbit to avoid the lunar flyby;
- Secondary propulsion: as actuator for attitude control law, since the satellite is too far from the Earth to use the Earth's magnetic field.

Another peculiarity of ArgoMoon is the use of radiation-resistant components. The absence of the protection provided by the magnetosphere requires the selection of components that have been designed and tested to withstand radiation. In order to provide detailed photographs of the mission, ArgoMoon is equipped with a narrow field of view camera to acquire inspection photography. This optical payload is supported by another one with wide field of view to provide images to the onboard computer where an imaging software process them in order to perform autonomous navigation and target fine pointing.

== Project and development ==
In September 2015, Argotec delivered the ArgoMoon proposal to NASA. The proposal was reviewed and approved by Italian Space Agency (ASI), European Space Agency (ESA) and then by NASA. The project is coordinated by the Italian Space Agency and the satellite launch is planned as a secondary payload of the Artemis 1 mission.

Argotec engineers worked in the definition of the mission objectives and phases, the mission analysis, and the configuration of the satellite. The electrical power subsystem, the on-board computer, and the on-board software are designed and developed by Argotec as well, including the imaging software for target recognition and pointing.

The selection of the components or units vendors has preferred European companies where available.

== See also ==
The 10 CubeSats flying in the Artemis 1 mission

- Near-Earth Asteroid Scout by NASA was a solar sail spacecraft that was planned to encounter a near-Earth asteroid (mission failure)
- BioSentinel is an astrobiology mission
- LunIR by Lockheed Martin Space
- Lunar IceCube, by the Morehead State University
- CubeSat for Solar Particles (CuSP)
- Lunar Polar Hydrogen Mapper (LunaH-Map), designed by the Arizona State University
- EQUULEUS, submitted by JAXA and the University of Tokyo
- OMOTENASHI, submitted by JAXA, was a lunar lander (mission failure)
- ArgoMoon, designed by Argotec and coordinated by Italian Space Agency (ASI)
- Team Miles, by Fluid and Reason LLC, Tampa, Florida

The 3 CubeSat missions removed from Artemis 1

- Lunar Flashlight will map exposed water ice on the Moon
- Cislunar Explorers, Cornell University, Ithaca, New York
- Earth Escape Explorer (CU-E^{3}), University of Colorado Boulder
