= OMOTENASHI =

Small spacecraft and semi-hard lander of the 6U CubeSat format

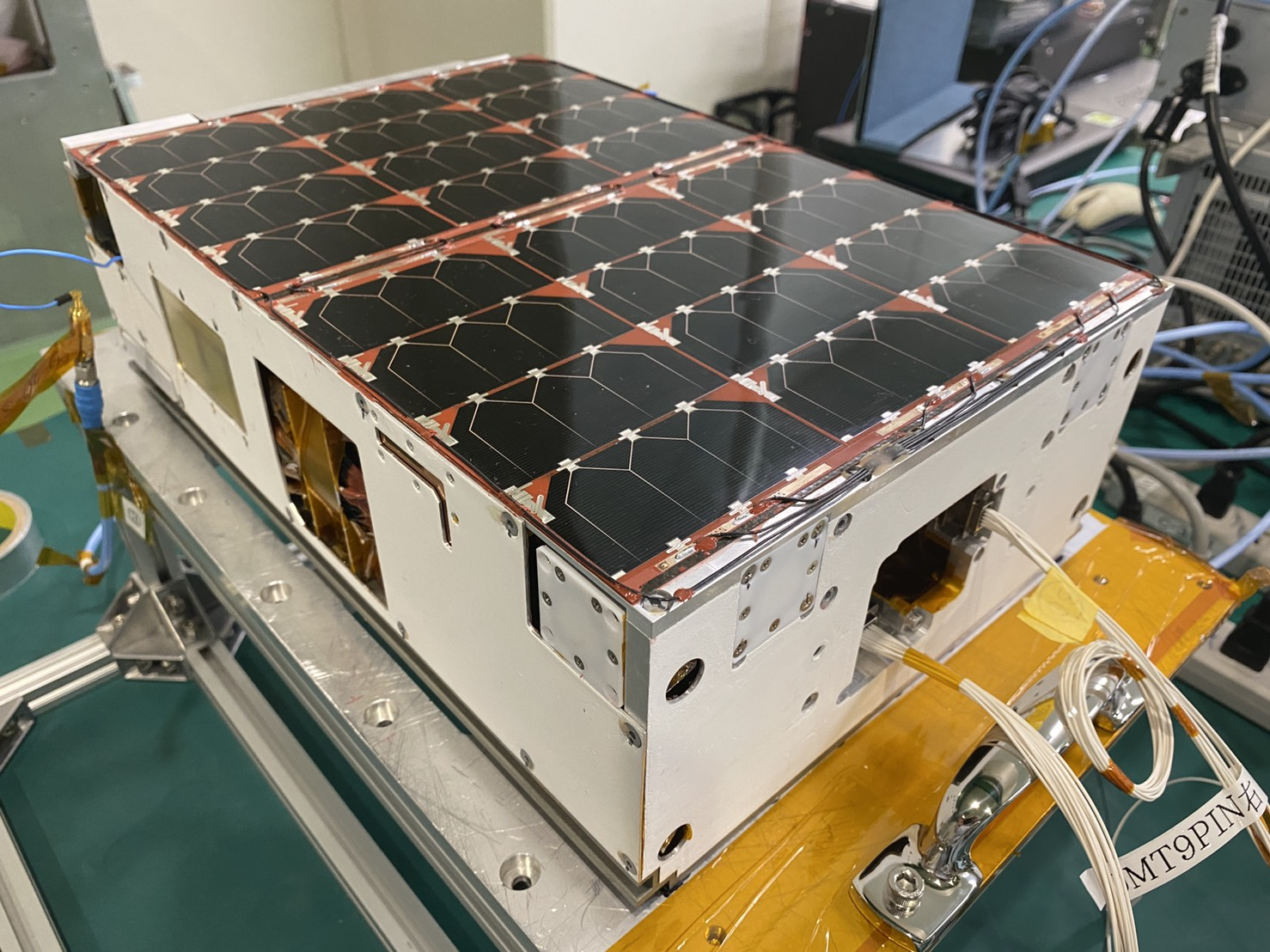
- Names: Outstanding MOon exploration TEchnologies demonstrated by NAno Semi-Hard Impactor
- Mission type: Technology demonstrator, Reconnaissance
- Operator: JAXA
- COSPAR ID: 2022-156D
- SATCAT no.: 55904
- Website: www.isas.jaxa.jp/home/omotenashi/index.html
- Mission duration: 1 day

Spacecraft properties
- Spacecraft: OMOTENASHI
- Spacecraft type: CubeSat
- Bus: 6U CubeSat
- Manufacturer: JAXA
- Launch mass: 12.6 kg (28 lb)
- Dimensions: 10 cm × 20 cm × 30 cm (3.9 in × 7.9 in × 11.8 in)
- Power: 30 watts

Start of mission
- Launch date: 16 November 2022, 06:47:44 UTC
- Rocket: SLS Block 1
- Launch site: Kennedy, LC-39B
- Contractor: NASA

End of mission
- Disposal: Spacecraft failure
- Last contact: 21 November 2022

Orbital parameters
- Reference system: Selenocentric orbit

Moon impactor
- Spacecraft component: Orbiter and lander

Transponders
- Band: X-band, S-band, P-band

Instruments
- Radiation monitor Accelerometer

Animation of OMOTENASHI around Earth Earth · OMOTENASHI · Moon

OMOTENASHI (Outstanding MOon exploration TEchnologies demonstrated by NAno Semi-Hard Impactor) was a small spacecraft and semi-hard lander of the 6U CubeSat format intended to demonstrate low-cost technology to land and explore the lunar surface. The CubeSat was to take measurements of the radiation environment near the Moon as well as on the lunar surface. Omotenashi is a Japanese word for "welcome" or "Hospitality".

OMOTENASHI was one of ten CubeSats launched with the Artemis 1 mission into a heliocentric orbit in cislunar space on the maiden flight of the Space Launch System (SLS), that took place on 16 November 2022.

After deployment from the Artemis I second stage, JAXA reported unstable communications with the spacecraft. On 21 November 2022, a Twitter message sent by JAXA reported that further attempts to communicate with the lander, which was scheduled to begin its landing sequences that day, had been ended.

== Etymology ==
The Japanese term omotenashi (お持て成し) means "hospitality".

== Overview ==
The OMOTENASHI mission was to land the smallest lunar lander up to then on the lunar surface to demonstrate the feasibility of the hardware for distributed synergistic exploration system with multi-point exploration. Once on the lunar surface, the OMOTENASHI lander was planned to observe the radiation environment of the lunar surface. The OMOTENASHI orbiter and lander were designed by the Japan Aerospace Exploration Agency (JAXA). It was a 6U CubeSat measuring 10 cm × 20 cm × 30 cm, and had a mass of 14 kg (31 lb). The principal investigator was Tatsuaki Hashimoto from JAXA. The spacecraft featured two body-fixed solar panels and lithium ion batteries. After measuring the radiation environment as it approached the Moon, OMOTENASHI's lander module was planned to perform a semi-hard landing on the lunar surface.

== Flight ==
JAXA announced that OMOTENASHI had successfully separated from the ICPS interstage around 90 minutes after launch. However, as of November 17, 2022, the spacecraft had yet to achieve Sun acquisition, and communication was unstable. JAXA continued operations to "stabilise attitude, secure power and establish communication," but after failing to restore operations, they abandoned recovery attempts on November 22. Reports indicate that the loss was due to failure of the solar cells to point toward the Sun. The next time they would be facing towards the Sun was March 2023. The team is considering recovery operations if they are able to reestablish contact with the spacecraft.

== Payload ==
The lander's scientific payload consisted of a radiation monitor and an accelerometer.

== Propulsion and proposed landing ==
OMOTENASHI was to use a cold gas thruster to enter a lunar-impact orbit, and a solid-rocket motor for the landing phase. The entry and landing phases would have been informed by the use of an X-band two-way Doppler radar. The orbiting module was planned to enter at a shallow flight-path angle of ≤7°, and to be ejected when the solid-rocket burn begins the deceleration manoeuvre. The rocket would have been ignited with a laser. After the deceleration rocket burn that was planned to last 15–20 seconds, OMOTENASHI's lander would have ejected the retrorocket, experiencing a free-fall of about 100 m. Just before impact, the lander was planned to deploy a single airbag about 50 cm in diameter to minimize the impact, estimated to be at 20–30 m/s.

Spacecraft components	Units/performance
Modules	* Orbiting module * Retro motor Module * Surface probe
Surface probe	0.7 kg Battery: 30 Wh; Consumption: 15 W
Orbiter	7 kg (including cold gas system)
Propulsion	* Solid motor: 6 kg (2500 m/s) - includes solid fuel * Cold gas jet: (N_{2}, 20 m/s)

== See also ==
The 10 CubeSats flying in the Artemis 1 mission

- Near-Earth Asteroid Scout by NASA was a solar sail spacecraft that was planned to encounter a near-Earth asteroid (mission failure)
- BioSentinel is an astrobiology mission
- LunIR by Lockheed Martin Space
- Lunar IceCube, by the Morehead State University
- CubeSat for Solar Particles (CuSP)
- Lunar Polar Hydrogen Mapper (LunaH-Map), designed by the Arizona State University
- EQUULEUS, submitted by JAXA and the University of Tokyo
- OMOTENASHI, submitted by JAXA, was a lunar lander (mission failure)
- ArgoMoon, designed by Argotec and coordinated by Italian Space Agency (ASI)
- Team Miles, by Fluid and Reason LLC, Tampa, Florida

The 3 CubeSat missions removed from Artemis 1

- Lunar Flashlight designed to map exposed water ice on the Moon
- Cislunar Explorers, Cornell University, Ithaca, New York
- Earth Escape Explorer (CU-E^{3}), University of Colorado Boulder
