= Earth Escape Explorer =

US experimental communications satellite

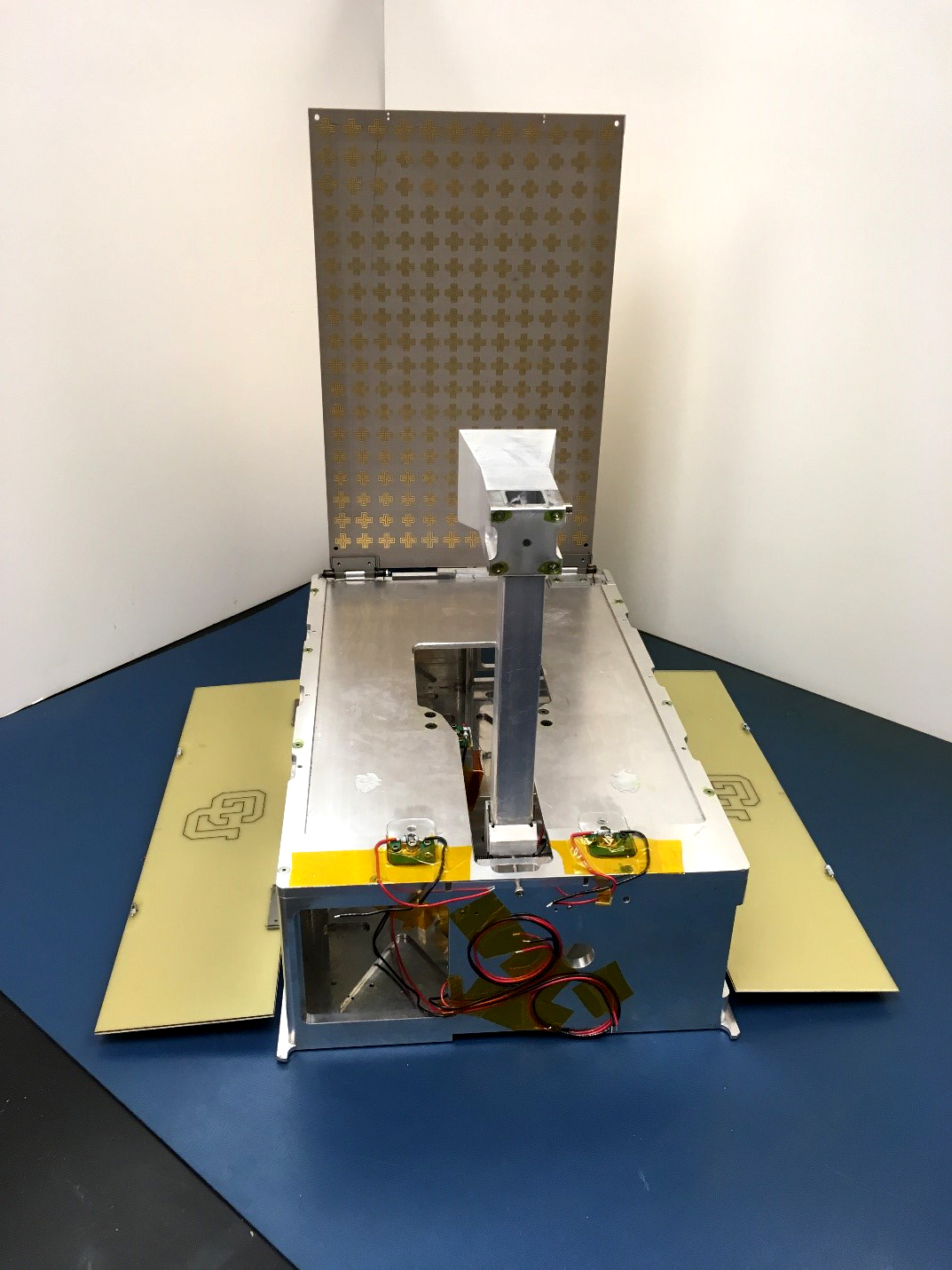
- Prototype of CU-E3 nanosatellite
- Names: CU-E^{3}
- Mission type: Technology demonstration
- Operator: University of Colorado Boulder
- Mission duration: 1 year (planned)

Spacecraft properties
- Spacecraft: Earth Escape Explorer
- Spacecraft type: 6U CubeSat
- Bus: XB1 (Blue Canyon Technologies - BCT)
- Manufacturer: University of Colorado Boulder
- Launch mass: 14 kg (31 lb)
- Dimensions: 10 cm × 20 cm × 30 cm

Start of mission
- Launch date: NET 2024 (planned)

Orbital parameters
- Reference system: Heliocentric orbit

Flyby of Moon

Transponders
- Band: Uplink: C-band; Downlink: X-band
- Frequency: C-band: 5182 MHz; X-band: 8447.6 MHz
- Capacity: 13 bit/s (at 27 million km)
- EIRP: 108 dBm
- NASA CubeQuest Challenge

Earth Escape Explorer (CU-E^{3}) is a nanosatellite of the 6U CubeSat format that will demonstrate long-distance communications while in heliocentric orbit.

The Earth Escape Explorer spacecraft is a student-driven effort at University of Colorado Boulder to design and build the spacecraft as part of the NASA CubeQuest Challenge. It was planned to be one of thirteen CubeSats carried with the Artemis 1 mission into a heliocentric orbit in cislunar space on the maiden flight of the Space Launch System (SLS) and the Orion spacecraft, scheduled to launch in 2022. Delays caused the spacecraft to miss its integration window to be included on Artemis 1; a new launch provider has not yet been chosen.

== Objectives ==
The CU-E^{3} team is pursuing four different CubeQuest prizes: largest aggregate data volume; most error-free data blocks; the most distant communications from Earth; and spacecraft longevity.

== Design ==
Once deployed in the vicinity of the Moon, CU-E^{3} will use a lunar gravity assist to propel itself into heliocentric orbit, trailing the Earth and slowly distancing itself over time. By the end of its one-year mission, CU-E^{3} is planned to be as far as 27 million kilometers from Earth. The spacecraft will use a commercial 6U CubeSat satellite body (bus) called XB1 of Blue Canyon Technologies (BCT), measuring about 10 cm × 20 cm × 30 cm. The mass is about 14 kg (31 lb). Electric power will be provided by solar panels and stored in rechargeable lithium batteries.

Communications

The mission is focused upon advancing deep space CubeSat communication techniques using an innovative reflective array antenna, an X-band transmitter for downlink and a C-band transmitter for uplink. The antenna array is "planar", meaning all of the elements are in one plane, yet provide a large aperture for beam steering and make possible high data rates. ATLAS Ground Networks will be the ground station for their uplink and downlink communications. Their telecomm package is called High-Rate CubeSat Communication System (HRCCS).

Propulsion

CU-E^{3} does not feature an onboard propulsion system, and will be using solar radiation pressure for reaction wheel desaturation and attitude control (orientation).

== See also ==
The 10 CubeSats flying in the Artemis 1 mission

- Near-Earth Asteroid Scout by NASA is a solar sail spacecraft that will encounter a near-Earth asteroid
- BioSentinel is an astrobiology mission
- LunIR by Lockheed Martin Space
- Lunar IceCube, by the Morehead State University
- CubeSat for Solar Particles (CuSP)
- Lunar Polar Hydrogen Mapper (LunaH-Map), designed by the Arizona State University
- EQUULEUS, submitted by JAXA and the University of Tokyo
- OMOTENASHI, submitted by JAXA, was a lunar lander (mission failure)
- ArgoMoon, designed by Argotec and coordinated by Italian Space Agency (ASI)
- Team Miles, by Fluid and Reason LLC, Tampa, Florida

The 3 CubeSat missions removed from Artemis 1

- Lunar Flashlight was planned to map exposed water ice on the Moon
- Cislunar Explorers, Cornell University, Ithaca, New York
- Earth Escape Explorer (CU-E^{3}), University of Colorado Boulder
