= Pathfinder Technology Demonstrator =

NASA Cubesat series

- Mission type: Technology demonstration
- Operator: NASA
- Mission duration: 90 days (planned)

Spacecraft properties
- Spacecraft: PTD-1 → PTD-5
- Spacecraft type: 6U CubeSat
- Bus: Tyvak
- Manufacturer: Ames Research Center and Glenn Research Center
- Launch mass: 11 kg (24 lb)
- Dimensions: 30 × 20 × 10 cm
- Power: 65 watts

Start of mission
- Launch date: 24 January 2021 (PTD-1)
- Rocket: Falcon 9
- Launch site: CCAFS,
- Contractor: SpaceX

Orbital parameters
- Reference system: Geocentric orbit
- Regime: Low Earth orbit
- Altitude: Sun-synchronous orbit

NASA's Pathfinder Technology Demonstrator (PTD) Project is a series of tech demonstrations of technologies aboard a series of nanosatellites known as CubeSats, providing significant enhancements to the performance of these versatile spacecraft. Each of the five planned PTD missions consist of a 6-unit (6U) CubeSat with expandable solar arrays.

Flight qualification and demonstration of these technologies carried aboard the PTD missions are expected to benefit future government and commercial missions. These include propulsion systems and sub-systems that stabilize and point the spacecraft to high accuracy in order to use a laser communications system capable of high-speed broadband.

The first mission, PTD-1, was scheduled for launch in December 2020 on a Falcon 9 rocket, from Cape Canaveral, as part of the ride-share ELaNa mission 35, launched on January 24th, 2021, and demonstrated HYDROS-C water-based propellant system. PTD-3 launched on May 25 2022 on the SpaceX Transporter-5 rideshare and demonstrated the TBIRD infrared communication system.

== Overview ==
The Pathfinder Technology Demonstrator (PTD) Project is led by NASA's Ames Research Center in California, in collaboration with NASA's Glenn Research Center in Ohio. The PTD project is managed and funded by NASA's Small Spacecraft Technology Program (SSTP) within the Space Technology Mission Directorate. The overall goal is to test the physics of key new technologies in order to enhance small spacecraft and make them able to reach new destinations and operate in new environments. These technologies will be tested in low Earth orbit for potential future application in small spacecraft operating in Earth orbit or in deep space. Technologies demonstrated by PTD flights may be applicable and scalable to larger spacecraft.

The project plans to fly five 6U CubeSat orbital missions, coded PTD-1 through PTD-5, at 6-month intervals, each flight assessing different technologies. Each mission will have a 90-day lifetime after it is released in low Earth orbit. Each spacecraft will include different test payloads such as propulsion systems for orbital station-keeping, maneuvering and interplanetary transit, laser high bandwidth communications, or high precision attitude control (orientation) systems to stabilize the spacecraft and point the designated instruments with high accuracy.

== Technology under assessment ==
Examples of novel systems to be tested are an electrospray thruster, water-based propulsion, and a very precise attitude control system.

- BET-100 μN is a colloid thruster fabricated by Busek that was successfully flown in the ESA LISA Pathfinder mission in 2016. Each thruster requires less than 6 watts of power.
- Attitude Determination and Control System (ADCS), uses Blue Canyon's Hyper-XACT ADCS. The package incorporates a star tracker, 3-4 reaction wheels, three torque rods, a magnetometer, an inertial measurement unit, and up to four Sun sensors.
- HYDROS is a hybrid chemical/electrical technology to provide propulsion using water. It uses an electrolysis cell to split water propellant into gaseous hydrogen and oxygen that are stored under pressure in separate tanks for burning in a thruster nozzle. This propulsion system is being developed by Tethers Unlimited, Inc.
- The MPS-130 engine by Aerojet Rocketdyne burns a novel ionic liquid propellant called hydroxylammonium nitrate (NH_{3}OHNO_{3}). It is a fuel/oxidizer blend also known as AF-M315E that is about 50% more efficient than traditional hydrazine, and is non-toxic. Aerojet Rocketdyne tested this engine and fuel on a mission called Green Propellant Infusion Mission, launched aboard a SpaceX Falcon Heavy rocket on 25 June 2019, on a test mission called Space Test Program 2.
- The PTD project will also evaluate the commercial Globalstar communications network for low cost in-space communications for sending commands to spacecraft in low Earth orbit. Each of the five planned spacecraft will incorporate a Globalstar GSP-1720 Duplex Modem.

== PTD-1 ==
A Request for Proposal (RFP) NNA16574335R was issued, on 12 February 2016, for the delivery of a spaceflight qualified 6U CubeSat spacecraft to be operated by NASA for its Pathfinder Technology Demonstrator (PTD) Project to accommodate technology subsystems, hereafter referred to as the payload. One flight demonstration is planned for a low thrust propulsion system with options for four follow-on technology demonstrations. Follow‐on missions may include payloads such as higher thrust propulsion systems or payloads such as optical communications or high precision attitude determination and control systems. Request for proposal response date: 4 April 2016.

The PTD-1 spacecraft is currently under development and fabrication. It will demonstrate a propulsion system with a water-based propellant obtained from electrolysis of water. While in orbit, the system separates onboard water into hydrogen and oxygen propellants by applying an electric current through the water. PTD-1 is scheduled for launch in December 2020 as part of the ride-share ELaNa mission 35 on board a Falcon 9 rocket.

PTD-1 launched January 24, 2021 on SpaceX rideshare Transporter-1 mission.

=== HYDROS Propulsion test ===
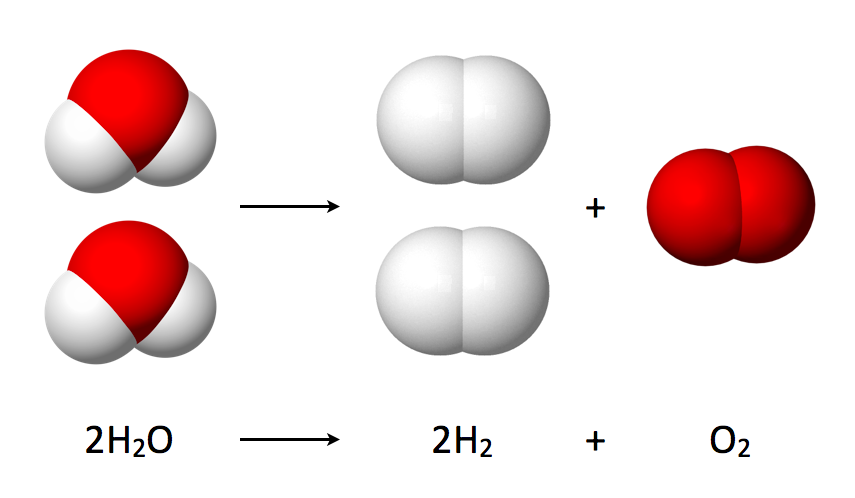
Diagram showing the overall chemical equation.

HYDROS is a hybrid chemical/electrical technology to provide propulsion using water. It uses an electrolysis cell to split water propellant into gaseous hydrogen and oxygen that are stored under pressure in separate tanks. The system then burns the hydrogen and oxygen mix in a simple thruster nozzle to provide up to 1 Newton and a specific impulse of 258 seconds. This propulsion system is being developed by Tethers Unlimited, Inc.

In pure water, at the negatively charged cathode, a reduction reaction takes place, with electrons (e^{−}) from the cathode being given to hydrogen cations to form hydrogen gas. The half reaction, balanced with acid, is:

Reduction at cathode: 2 H^{+} (Aqueous solution) + 2e^{−} → H_{2} (gas)

At the positively charged anode, an oxidation reaction occurs, generating oxygen gas and giving electrons to the anode to complete the circuit:

Oxidation at anode: 2 H_{2}O (liquid) → O_{2} (gas) + 4 H^{+} (aqueous solution) + 4e^{−}

Overall reaction: 2 H_{2}O (liquid) → 2 H_{2} (gas) + O_{2} (gas)

The propulsion system uses the electricity generated by the solar arrays to power the miniature water electrolysis. The demonstration will test propulsion performance through programmed changes in spacecraft velocity and altitude.

== PTD-2 ==
PTD-2 is a 6U CubeSat technology demonstration mission to demonstrate an improved attitude determination and control system that was developed under the Tipping Point Program. The HyperXACT design will provide 5X improvement in reliability and pointing over the many state of the art systems whilst maintaining the 1/2 U form factor.

PTD-2 was also the intended platform for a NASA demonstration of the GLOBALSTAR satellite communication modem.

PTD-2 was terminated after a mishap during integration and test of the Space Vehicle.

It was ultimately replaced by PTD-2R, also known as PTD-R. PTD-R was launched 8/16/2024 on SpaceX transporter-11, with the Lawrence Livermore National Lab developed Payload "Deep Purple". Deep Purple is a technology demonstration of a co-aligned pair of UV/SWIR telescopes.

NASA PTD SITE https://www.nasa.gov/smallspacecraft/pathfinder-technology-demonstrator/

== PTD-3 ==
PTD-3, a 6U cubesat, launched on May 25 2022 on SpaceX's Transporter-5 rideshare mission, includes the 3U TeraByte InfraRed Delivery (TBIRD) laser communications test. TBIRD will send data at 200 Gbps from LEO to ground stations. By Dec 2022, TBIRD demonstrated 100 Gbps data transfers from a 300 mile orbit to Earth, and plans to test 200-1,000 Gbps. On April 28, 2023, 200 gigabit per second (Gbps) throughput was achieved.

== PTD-4 ==
A 6U cubesat to demonstrate the Lightweight Integrated Solar Array and anTenna (LISA-T), a very high-power, low-volume deployable solar array with an integrated antenna. LISA-T is being developed by NASA’s Marshall Space Flight Center in Huntsville, Alabama. LISA-T offers lower mass and stored volume as well as a greater power per unit mass compared to current available solar array technology. As of December 2023, no launch date is set. The nanosatellite was launched along with PTD-R on SpaceX's Transporter-11 mission out of Vandenberg Space Force Base. Transporter-11 launched in August 2024.

== PTD-R (PTD-5) ==
A 6U cubesat to demonstrate simultaneous ultraviolet and short-wave infrared optical sensing from space for the first time via two 85-mm aperture monolithic telescopes mounted side-by-side, using a new compact custom electronics module and a novel, lightweight, carbon-composite optical housing and radiator. It was launched on 16 August 2024 as part of SpaceX's Transporter-11 mission out of Vandenberg Space Force Base.

== See also ==
- Cislunar Explorers, another spacecraft using water electrolysis to generate propellant
- World Is Not Enough, a spacecraft propulsion system using water harvested in-situ
