= EQUULEUS =

Japanese nanosatellite

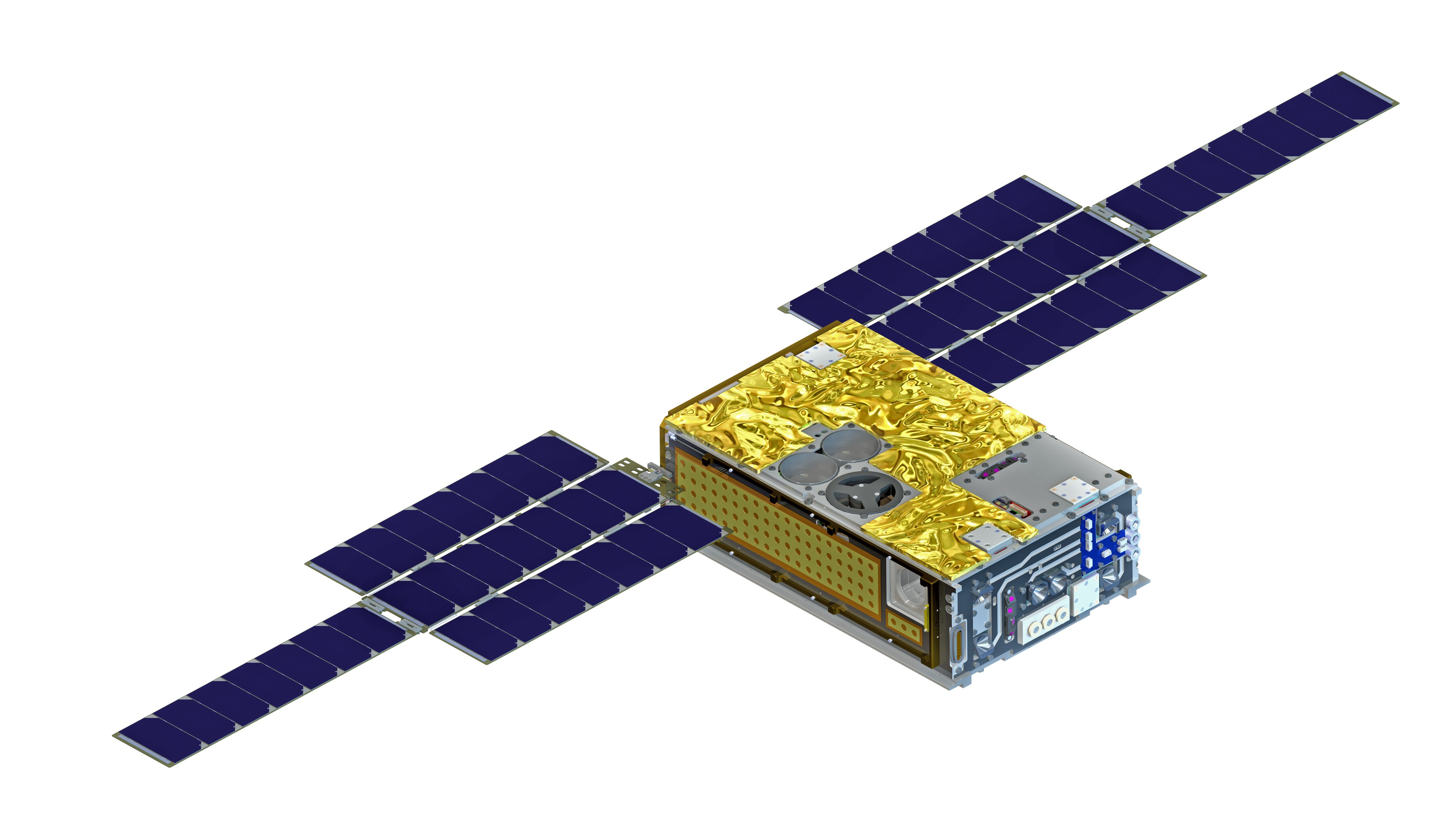
- Depiction of EQUULEUS in deployed position
- Mission type: Technology
- Operator: JAXA; University of Tokyo
- COSPAR ID: 2022-156E
- SATCAT no.: 55905
- Website: https://www.space.t.u-tokyo.ac.jp/equuleus
- Mission duration: 6 months, 2 days

Spacecraft properties
- Spacecraft: EQUULEUS
- Spacecraft type: CubeSat (6U)
- Manufacturer: JAXA / University of Tokyo
- Launch mass: 14 kg (31 lb)
- Dimensions: 10 cm × 20 cm × 30 cm (3.9 in × 7.9 in × 11.8 in)
- Power: 15 watts

Start of mission
- Launch date: 16 November 2022, 06:47:44 UTC
- Rocket: SLS Block 1
- Launch site: Kennedy, LC-39B
- Contractor: NASA

End of mission
- Disposal: Spacecraft failure
- Last contact: 18 May 2023

Flyby of Moon
- Closest approach: 21 November 2022, 16:25 UTC
- Distance: 5,000 km (3,100 mi)

Transponders
- Band: X-band and Ka-band
- TWTA power: 13 watts
Instruments
- PHOENIX: Plasmaspheric Helium ion Observation by Enhanced New Imager in eXtreme ultraviolet
- DELPHIUS: DEtection camera for Lunar impact PHenomena IN 6U Spacecraft
- CLOTH: Cis-Lunar Object Detector within Thermal Insulation

EQUULEUS (EQUilibriUm Lunar-Earth point 6U Spacecraft) was a nanosatellite of the 6U CubeSat format that measured the distribution of plasma that surrounds the Earth (plasmasphere) to help scientists understand the radiation environment in that region. It also demonstrated low-thrust trajectory control techniques, such as multiple lunar flybys, within the Earth-Moon region using water steam as propellant. The spacecraft was designed and developed jointly by the Japan Aerospace Exploration Agency (JAXA) and the University of Tokyo.

EQUULEUS was one of ten CubeSats launched with the Artemis 1 mission into a heliocentric orbit in cislunar space on the maiden flight of the Space Launch System that took place on 16 November 2022. On 17 November 2022, Japan Aerospace Exploration Agency (JAXA) reported that EQUULEUS separated successfully on 16 November 2022 and was confirmed to be operating normally on 16 November 2022 at 13:50 UTC and it operated until 18 May 2023. EQUULEUS also filmed the comet C/2022 E3 (ZTF) in February 2023.

Animation of EQUULEUS around Earth Earth · Moon · EQUULEUS

== Overview ==
Mapping the plasmasphere around Earth may provide important insight for protecting both humans and electronics from radiation damage during long space journeys. It will also demonstrate low-thrust trajectory control techniques, such as multiple lunar flybys, within the Earth-Moon Lagrange points (EML). The mission will demonstrate that departing from EML can transfer to various orbits, such as Earth orbits, Moon orbits, and interplanetary orbits, with a tiny amount of orbital control. EQUULEUS features 2 deployable solar panels, and lithium batteries.

The mission was monitored from the Japanese deep space antenna (64-meter antenna and 34-meter antenna) with support from the DSN (Deep Space Network) of Jet Propulsion Laboratory (JPL). The principal investigator is Professor Hashimoto at the Japan Aerospace Exploration Agency (JAXA). The mission is named after the 'little horse' constellation Equuleus.

== Propulsion ==
Propellant mass and composition	Water (1.2 kg)
Thrust	2 - 4 mN
Specific impulse	>70 seconds
Stored pressure	< 100 kPa
Power	12 – 15 watts
Total Delta-V	70 m/s

The propulsion system, called AQUARIUS, employs 8 water thrusters also used for attitude control (orientation) and momentum management. The spacecraft carries 1.2 kg of water, and the complete propulsion system occupied about 2.5 units out of the 6 units total spacecraft volume. The waste heat from the communication components is reused to assist the pre-heater in the water vapor production system. The water is heated to 100 °C (212 °F) at the pre-heater. The AQUARIUS' water thrusters produce a total of 4.0 mN, a specific impulse (I_{sp}) of 70 seconds, and consumes about 20 watts power. Before its flight on EQUULEUS, AQUARIUS was first tested on the 2019 AQT-D CubeSat.

== Scientific payload ==
Several of EQUULEUS's instruments are named after the constellations that neighbor Equuleus.

=== PHOENIX ===
EQUULEUS' scientific payload features a small UV imager named PHOENIX (Plasmaspheric Helium ion Observation by Enhanced New Imager in eXtreme ultraviolet) that will operate in the high-energy extreme ultraviolet wavelengths. It consists of an entrance mirror of 60 mm diameter, and a photon counting device. The reflectivity of the mirror is optimized for the emission line of helium ion (30.4 nm wavelength), which is the relevant component of the plasmasphere of Earth. The plasmasphere is where various phenomena are caused by the electromagnetic disturbances by the solar wind. By flying far from the Earth, the PHOENIX telescope will provide a global image of the plasmasphere of Earth and contribute to its spatial and temporal evolution.

=== DELPHINUS ===
DELPHINUS (DEtection camera for Lunar impact PHenomena IN 6U Spacecraft), or DLP for short, is a camera connected to the PHOENIX telescope to observe lunar impact flashes and near-Earth asteroids (NEO), as well as potential 'mini-moons' while positioned at the Earth-Moon Lagrangian point L2 (L2) halo orbit. Theoretically, NEOs approaching Earth can be briefly caught within gravity of Earth well, and although in terms of orbital mechanics the object's movements is still centered around the Sun, to an observer on Earth it will move as if it is a moon of the planet. One example of such an object is 2006 RH120, which orbited Earth between 2006 and 2007. If a mini-moon or NEO that can be rendezvoused by EQUULEUS is identified, the CubeSat will attempt a flyby. This payload occupies about 0.5 units out of the total 6 units volume. The results will contribute to the risk evaluation for future infrastructure or human activity on the lunar surface.

=== CLOTH ===
The instrument named CLOTH (Cis-Lunar Object detector within THermal insulation) will detect and evaluate the meteoroid impact flux in the cislunar space by using dust detectors mounted on the exterior of the spacecraft. The goal of this instrument is to determine the size and spatial distribution of dust solid objects in the cislunar space. CLOTH utilizes the spacecraft's multi-layer insulation (MLI) as a detector, thus realizing a dust counter suitable for mass-constrained CubeSats. It will be the first instrument to measure the dust environment of the Earth–Moon L2 Lagrange point, and aims to uncover the dust's origin, as well as conducting risk assessment of the L2 point dust particles in anticipation of a future crewed mission. CLOTH will decipher L2 point dust (likely originating from mini-moons) from sporadic dust by differences in their impact velocity.

== See also ==
The 10 CubeSats flying in the Artemis 1 mission

- Near-Earth Asteroid Scout by NASA was a solar sail spacecraft that was planned to encounter a near-Earth asteroid (mission failure)
- BioSentinel is an astrobiology mission
- LunIR by Lockheed Martin Space
- Lunar IceCube, by the Morehead State University
- CubeSat for Solar Particles (CuSP)
- Lunar Polar Hydrogen Mapper (LunaH-Map), designed by the Arizona State University
- EQUULEUS, submitted by JAXA and the University of Tokyo
- OMOTENASHI, submitted by JAXA, was a lunar lander (mission failed)
- ArgoMoon, designed by Argotec and coordinated by Italian Space Agency (ASI)
- Team Miles, by Fluid and Reason LLC, Tampa, Florida

The 3 CubeSat missions removed from Artemis 1

- Lunar Flashlight will map exposed water ice on the Moon
- Cislunar Explorers, Cornell University, Ithaca, New York
- Earth Escape Explorer (CU-E^{3}), University of Colorado Boulder

CubeSat and microsatellite projects of ISSL

- Hodoyoshi 3
- Hodoyoshi 4
- PROCYON
- TRICOM-1R
- Nano-JASMINE
- ISSL Mars mission
