= Lunar IceCube =

Nanosatellite launched in 2022

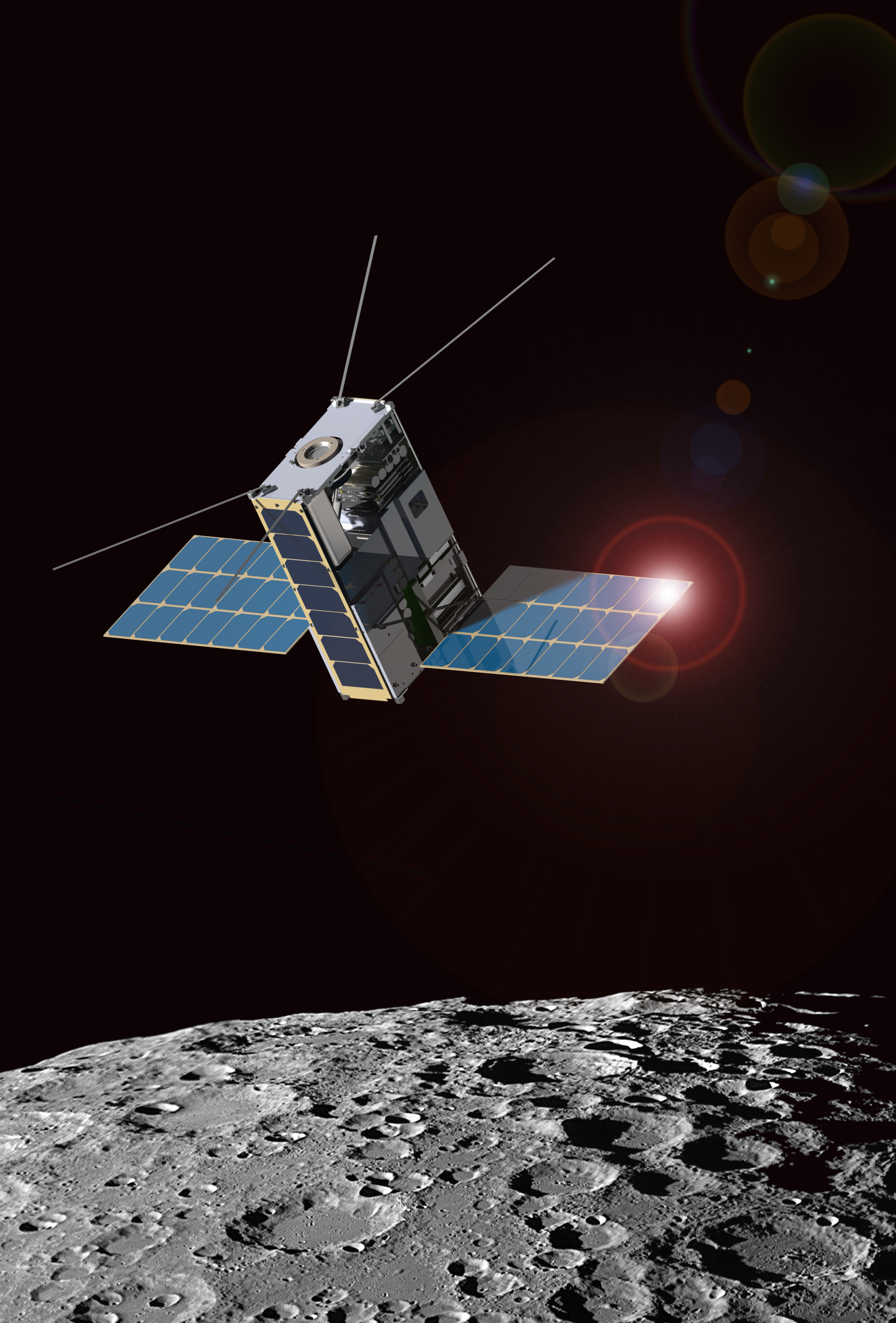
- Artist's rendering of the Lunar IceCube spacecraft
- Mission type: Lunar orbiter
- Operator: Morehead State University / NASA
- COSPAR ID: 2022-156C
- SATCAT no.: 55903
- Mission duration: 18 months (planned); ~1 hour (total)

Spacecraft properties
- Spacecraft: Lunar IceCube
- Spacecraft type: CubeSat
- Bus: 6U CubeSat
- Manufacturer: Morehead State University
- Launch mass: 14 kg (31 lb)
- Dimensions: 10 cm x 20 cm x 30 cm
- Power: 2 deployable solar panels

Start of mission
- Launch date: 16 November 2022, 06:47:44 UTC
- Rocket: SLS Block 1 / Artemis 1
- Launch site: KSC, LC-39B
- Contractor: NASA

End of mission
- Disposal: Spacecraft failure
- Last contact: 16 November 2022, 08:00
- Decay date: 28 June 2024

Orbital parameters
- Reference system: Lunar orbit
- Regime: Polar orbit
- Periselene altitude: 100 km (62 mi)
- Inclination: 90°

Moon orbiter
- Orbital insertion: 28 April 2023 (planned) (Note: Arrival time is 163 days after launch, using 0.12 kg (0.26 lb) of its onboard propellant.)

Transponders
- Band: X-band
Instruments
- BIRCHES: Broadband InfraRed Compact High Resolution Exploration Spectrometer

Lunar IceCube was a NASA nanosatellite orbiter mission that was intended to prospect, locate, and estimate amount and composition of water ice deposits on the Moon for future exploitation. It was launched as a secondary payload mission on Artemis 1 (formerly known as Exploration Mission 1), the first flight of the Space Launch System (SLS), on 16 November 2022. As of February 2023 it is unknown whether NASA has established contact with the satellite or not.

== Overview ==
The lunar mission was designed by Morehead State University and its partners, the Busek Company, NASA Goddard Space Flight Center (GSFC), and The Catholic University of America (CUA). It was selected in April 2015 by NASA's NextSTEP program (Next Space Technologies for Exploration Partnerships) and awarded a contract worth up to US$7.9 million for further development.

The Lunar IceCube spacecraft has a 6U CubeSat format, with a mass of about 14 kg (31 lb). It is one of ten CubeSats carried on board the maiden flight of the SLS, Artemis 1, as secondary payloads in cis-lunar space, in 2022. It was deployed during the lunar trajectory, and was intended to use an innovative electric RF ion engine to achieve lunar capture to an orbit about 100 km (62 mi) above the lunar surface, to make systematic measurements of lunar water features. The principal investigator is Ben Malphrus, Director of the Space Science Center at Morehead State University.

=== History ===
NASA's Lunar Prospector, Clementine, Lunar Crater Observation and Sensing Satellite (LCROSS), the Lunar Reconnaissance Orbiter (LRO) and India's Chandrayaan-1 lunar orbiters and other missions, confirmed both water (H_{2}O) and hydroxyl (—OH^{−}) deposits at high latitudes on the lunar surface, indicating the presence of trace amounts of adsorbed or bound water are present, but their instruments weren't optimized for fully or systematically characterizing the elements in the infrared wavelength bands ideal for detecting water. These missions suggest that there might be enough ice water at polar regions to be used by future landed missions, but the distribution is difficult to reconcile with thermal maps.

Thus, the science goals were to investigate the distribution of water and other volatiles, as a function of time of day, latitude, and lunar soil composition.

=== Launch ===
The cubesat was launched on 16 November 2022 on the Space Launch System during the launch of Artemis 1. The vehicle successfully communicated with the ground after deployment on 17 November, but on Nov. 29 2022, NASA announced that the mission team was “continuing its attempts to communicate with the CubeSat so that it can be placed into its science orbit in the coming days.” The site has not been updated since, and the status of the spacecraft is unknown.

== Spacecraft ==
=== Instruments ===
Lunar IceCube carried a Broadband InfraRed Compact High Resolution Exploration Spectrometer (BIRCHES) instrument, developed by NASA's Goddard Space Flight Center (GSFC). BIRCHES is a compact version of the volatile-seeking spectrometer instrument onboard the New Horizons Pluto flyby mission.

=== Propulsion ===
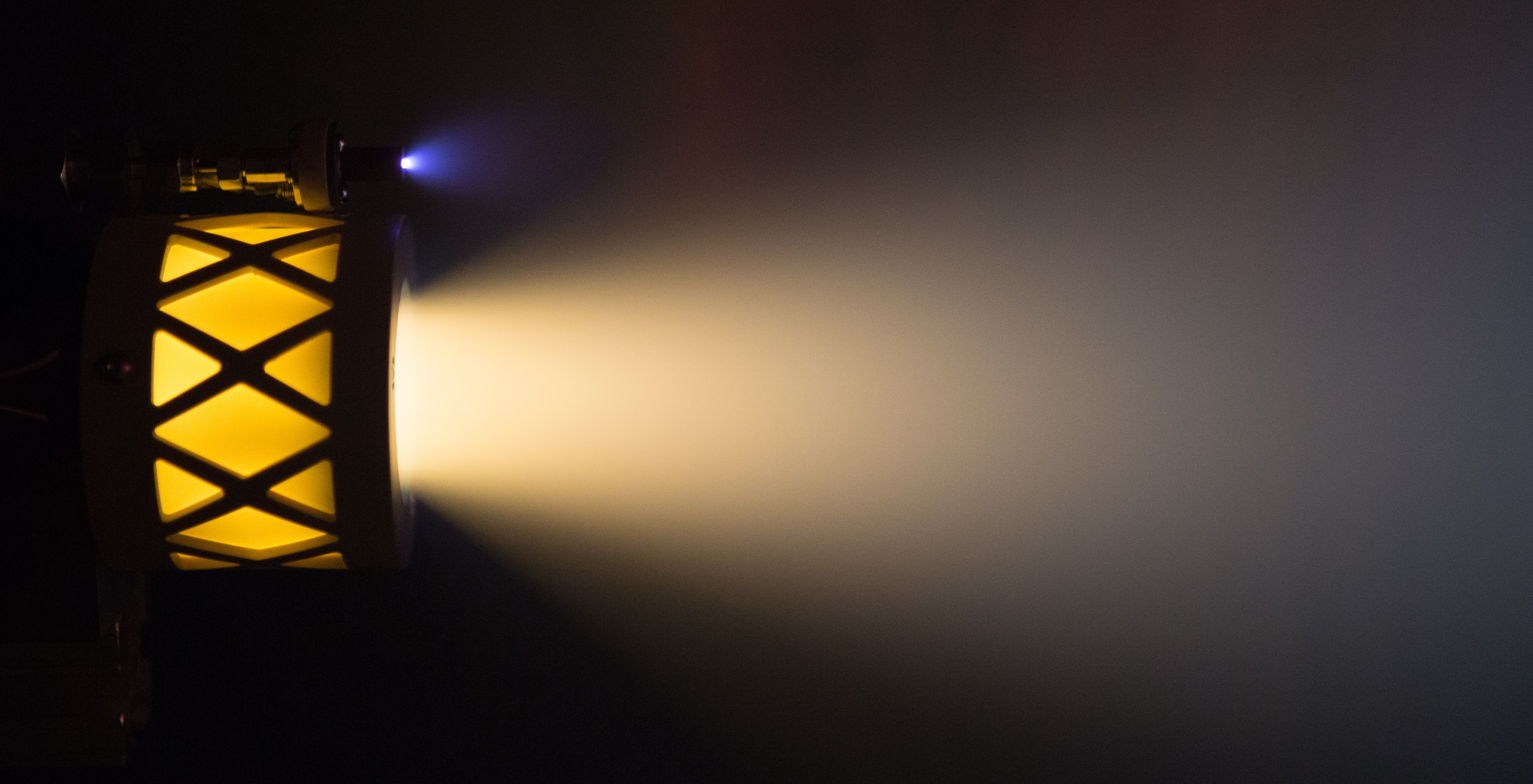
Iodine BIT-3 (Busek Ion Thruster) in operation

The tiny CubeSat spacecraft will make use of a miniature electric RF ion engine system based on Busek's 3 centimeter RF ion thruster, also known as BIT-3. It utilizes a solid iodine propellant and an inductively-coupled plasma system that produces 1.1 mN thrust and 2800 seconds specific impulse from approximately 50 watts total input power. It will also use this engine for capture into lunar orbit, and orbit adjustments. It is estimated the spacecraft will take about 3 months to reach the Moon.

=== Flight software ===
The flight software was developed in SPARK/Ada by the Vermont Technical College Cubesat Laboratory. SPARK/Ada has the lowest error rate of any computer language, important for the reliability and success of this complicated spacecraft. It is used in commercial and military aircraft, air traffic control and high speed trains. This is the second spacecraft using SPARK/Ada, the first being the BasicLEO CubeSat also by the Vermont Technical College CubeSat Laboratory, the only fully successful university CubeSat out of 12 on the NASA ELaNa-IV launch on U.S. Air Force Operationally Responsive Space-3 (ORS-3) mission.

== See also ==
- List of missions to the Moon

The 10 CubeSats flying in the Artemis 1 mission

- Near-Earth Asteroid Scout, from NASA Marshall Space Flight Center, was a solar sail spacecraft that was planned to encounter a near-Earth asteroid (mission failure)
- BioSentinel, from NASA Ames Research Center, is an astrobiology mission
- LunIR by Lockheed Martin Space
- Lunar IceCube, from the Morehead State University
- CubeSat for Solar Particles (CuSP)
- Lunar Polar Hydrogen Mapper (LunaH-Map), designed by the Arizona State University
- EQUULEUS, submitted by JAXA and the University of Tokyo
- OMOTENASHI, submitted by JAXA, was a lunar lander (mission failure)
- ArgoMoon, designed by Argotec and coordinated by Italian Space Agency (ASI)
- Team Miles, by Fluid and Reason LLC, Tampa, Florida

The 3 CubeSat missions removed from Artemis 1

- Lunar Flashlight, with a mission to map exposed water ice on the Moon
- Cislunar Explorers, Cornell University, Ithaca, New York
- Earth Escape Explorer (CU-E^{3}), University of Colorado Boulder
