= Tera-hertz Explorer =

Mars lander and orbiter to investigate atmospheric chemistry

- Mission type: Science, reconnaissance
- Operator: NICT
- Website: https://www2.nict.go.jp/ttrc/thz-sensing/terex/

Spacecraft properties
- Manufacturer: NICT & University of Tokyo

Start of mission
- Launch date: mid 2020s (as a secondary payload of another flight to Mars)
- Rocket: To be announced

Mars lander
- Landing site: Isidis Planitia

Instruments
- terahertz sensor

The Tera-hertz Explorer (TEREX) mission is a planned orbiter and lander that will be carrying a terahertz sensor to the surface of Mars to measure the oxygen isotope ratios of various molecules in the Martian atmosphere. The objective of the mission is to understand the chain of chemical reactions that resupply the atmosphere with carbon dioxide.

The lander, TEREX-1, was originally supposed to launch as a piggyback with another payload during the July 2020 Mars launch window, but this has subsequently been delayed to 2022 and then to the mid 2020s. As of September 2017, no official launch arrangement with a primary mission had yet been reached. The spacecraft will orbit Mars briefly before landing the instrument on the surface. A dedicated orbiter, TEREX-2, was planned for launch in 2024. It will conduct a global survey of the Martian atmosphere and surface, focusing on water and oxygen levels.

The mission is being developed by Japan's National Institute of Information and Communications Technology (NICT), and the University of Tokyo Intelligent Space Systems Laboratory (ISSL). The project is based on a past proposal named FIRE (Far InfraRed Experiment), which was a sensor intended for JAXA's cancelled MELOS Mars orbiter.

If successful, it will be Japan's first successful Mars spacecraft since the ill-fated Nozomi mission.

== Development ==
ISSL has previously developed two deep space probes: the PROCYON asteroid probe and the EQUULEUS CubeSat mission to Earth–Moon L_{2} Lagrangian point. NICT will put into use their experience developing the SMILES (Superconducting Submillimeter-Wave Limb-Emission Sounder) instrument on board the ISS Kibo module, and SWI (Sub-millimeter Wave Instrument) on board the Jupiter Icy Moons Explorer, which the institute jointly developed with ESA and DLR (German Aerospace Center). Unlike the Japanese Space Agency (JAXA), which is under the jurisdiction of the Ministry of Education, Culture, Sports, Science and Technology, NICT's parent agency is the Ministry of Internal Affairs and Communications (MIC). MIC formally approved the Tera-hertz Explorer mission in early 2017.

== Spacecraft ==
The preliminary lander's dimensions are a 50 cm cube, and may have a mass of 140 kg (310 lb) including propellant. Its landing system is proposed to employ an inflatable aeroshell decelerator, and an airbag.
