= LunIR =

Spacecraft

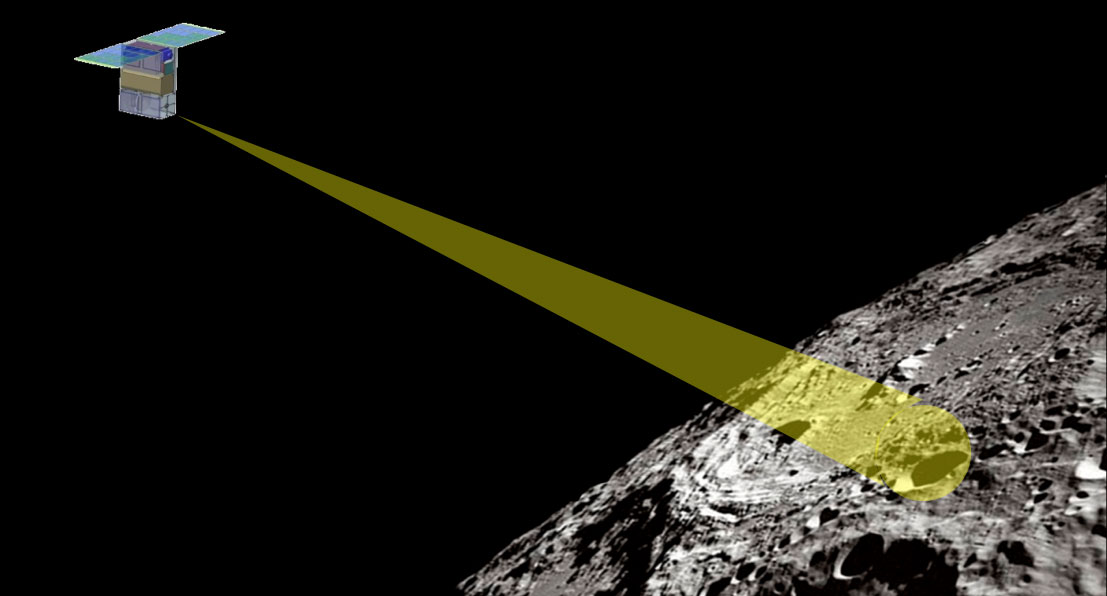
- The LunIR CubeSat, which will characterize and collect lunar surface data.
- Names: SkyFire
- Mission type: Technology demonstrator, reconnaissance
- Operator: Lockheed Martin Space
- COSPAR ID: 2022-156K
- SATCAT no.: 57686
- Mission duration: 3 years, 4 months and 27 days (in progress)

Spacecraft properties
- Spacecraft: CubeSat
- Spacecraft type: 6U CubeSat
- Bus: Tyvak Nano-Satellite Systems
- Manufacturer: Lockheed Martin Space
- Launch mass: 14 kg (31 lb)
- Dimensions: 10 cm × 20 cm × 30 cm

Start of mission
- Launch date: 16 November 2022, 06:47:44 UTC
- Rocket: SLS Block 1
- Launch site: KSC, LC-39B
- Contractor: NASA

Flyby of Moon

LunIR (Lunar InfraRed Imaging, formerly known as SkyFire) is a nanosatellite spacecraft launched to the Moon collecting surface spectroscopy and thermography. It was launched as a secondary payload on the Artemis 1 mission on 16 November 2022.

== Mission ==
LunIR is a technology demonstration mission funded by NASA that uses a low-cost 6U CubeSat spacecraft. LunIR will perform a lunar flyby, collecting spectroscopy and thermography for surface characterization, remote sensing, and site selection. The spacecraft includes two deployable solar panels and will have a total mass of about 14 kg (31 lb).

LunIR was selected in April 2015 by NASA's NextSTEP program (Next Space Technologies for Exploration Partnerships) and awarded a contract to Lockheed Martin Space worth US$1.4 million for further development.

LunIR will communicate with Earth via ground stations operated by Kongsberg Satellite Services. LunIR will use 13-meter-diameter radio antennas located in Punta Arenas, Chile; Svalbard, Norway; and Troll station, Antarctica.

== Launch ==
LunIR was launched as one of ten CubeSats as a secondary payload on the maiden flight of the Space Launch System, Artemis 1.

== Propulsion ==
LunIR will demonstrate a low thrust electric propulsion technology called electrospray propulsion to lower the spacecraft's orbit for additional science and technology mission objectives.

== See also ==
The 10 CubeSats flying in the Artemis 1 mission

- Near-Earth Asteroid Scout by NASA was a solar sail spacecraft that was planned to encounter a near-Earth asteroid (mission failure)
- BioSentinel is an astrobiology mission
- LunIR by Lockheed Martin Space
- Lunar IceCube, by the Morehead State University
- CubeSat for Solar Particles (CuSP)
- Lunar Polar Hydrogen Mapper (LunaH-Map), designed by the Arizona State University
- EQUULEUS, submitted by JAXA and the University of Tokyo
- OMOTENASHI, submitted by JAXA, was a lunar lander (mission failure)
- ArgoMoon, designed by Argotec and coordinated by Italian Space Agency (ASI)
- Team Miles, by Fluid and Reason LLC, Tampa, Florida

The three CubeSat missions removed from Artemis 1

- Lunar Flashlight will map exposed water ice on the Moon
- Cislunar Explorers, Cornell University, Ithaca, New York
- Earth Escape Explorer (CU-E^{3}), University of Colorado Boulder
