= CubeSat for Solar Particles =

Nanosatellite

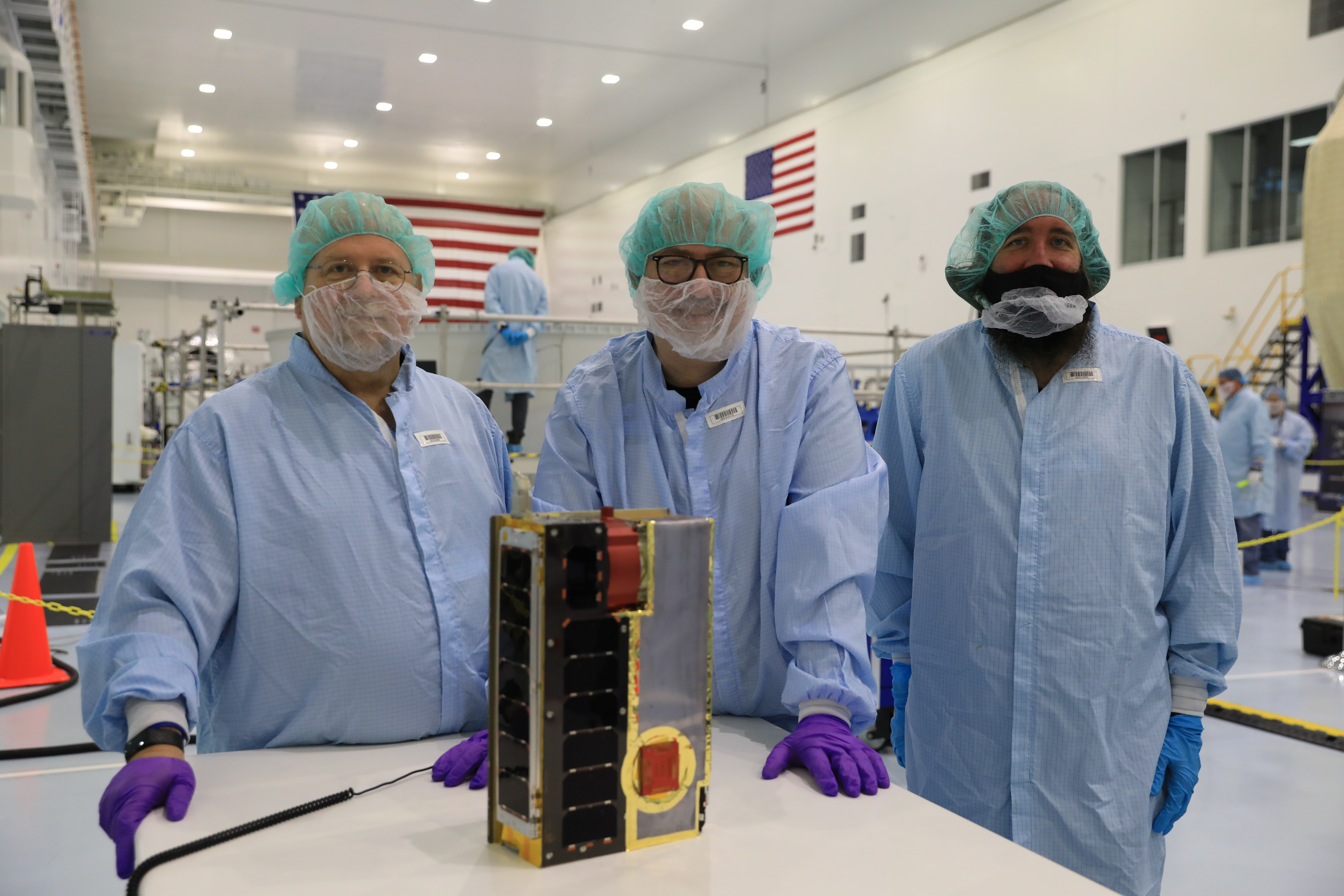
- The CuSP Team delivers the Cubesat to NASA's Kennedy Space Center. Shown are (left to right) Mike Epperly, Project Manager, Dr. Don George, Mission Engineer, and Chad Loeffler, Flight Software Engineer.
- Names: CuSP
- Mission type: Technology demonstration, Space Weather
- Operator: Goddard Space Flight Center (GSFC)
- Mission duration: 81 minutes 6 seconds

Spacecraft properties
- Spacecraft: CubeSat
- Spacecraft type: 6U CubeSat
- Bus: SwRI Custom Design
- Manufacturer: Southwest Research Institute (SwRI)
- Launch mass: 10.2 kg (22 lb)
- Dimensions: 10 cm × 20 cm × 30 cm
- Power: 45.46 watts

Start of mission
- Launch date: 16 November 2022, 06:47:44 UTC
- Rocket: SLS Block 1
- Launch site: KSC, LC-39B
- Contractor: NASA

End of mission
- Last contact: 16 November 2022

Orbital parameters
- Reference system: Heliocentric orbit

Flyby of Moon

Instruments
- Suprathermal Ion Spectrograph (SIS); Miniaturized Electron and Proton Telescope (MERiT); Vector Helium Magnetometer (VHM)

CubeSat for Solar Particles (CuSP) was a low-cost 6U CubeSat to orbit the Sun to study the dynamic particles and magnetic fields. The principal investigator for CuSP is Mihir Desai, at the Southwest Research Institute (SwRI) in San Antonio, Texas. It was launched on the maiden flight of the Space Launch System (SLS), as a secondary payload of the Artemis 1 mission on 16 November 2022.

Following deployment from the Artemis launch adaptor, contact with the spacecraft showed that it successfully stabilized and deployed its solar arrays, but contact was lost after about an hour.

== Objective ==
Measuring space weather that can create a wide variety of effects at Earth, from interfering with radio communications to tripping up satellite electronics to creating electric currents in power grids, is of importance. To create a network of space weather stations would require many instruments scattered throughout space millions of miles apart, but the cost of such a system is prohibitive. Though the CubeSats can only carry a few instruments, they are relatively inexpensive to launch because of their small mass and standardized design. Thus, CuSP also was intended as a test for creating a network of space science stations.

== The CuSP team ==
CuSP Spacecraft Team:

- Dr. Mihir Desai, PhD: Principal Investigator
- Mike Epperly: Project Manager
- Dr. Don George, PhD: Mission System Engineer
- Chad Loeffler: Flight Software Engineer
- Raymond Doty: Spacecraft Technician
- Dr. Frederic Allegrini, PhD: SIS Instrument Lead
- Dr. Neil Murphy, PhD: VHM Instrument Lead
- Dr. Shrikanth Kanekal, PhD, MERiT Instrument Lead

== Payload ==
This CubeSat carried three scientific instruments:

- The Suprathermal Ion Spectrograph (SIS), is built by the Southwest Research Institute to detect and characterize low-energy solar energetic particles.
- Miniaturized Electron and Proton Telescope (MERiT), is built by the NASA's Goddard Space Flight Center and will return counts of high-energy solar energetic particles.
- Vector Helium Magnetometer (VHM), being built by NASA's Jet Propulsion Laboratory, will measure the strength and direction of magnetic fields.

Propulsion

The satellite features a cold gas thruster system for propulsion, attitude control (orientation) and orbital maneuvering.

== Spacecraft bus ==
The spacecraft's bus consisted of:

- SwRI Spacecraft Integrator: Design, Assembly, Integration and Test
- SwRI SATYR Command and Data Handling Unit
- SwRI Flight Software
- Clyde-Space AAC Electrical Power System
  - BCR MPPT converters
  - LiPo Batteries and
  - Deployable and Fixed Solar Arrays
- VACCO MiPS Cold Gas Thruster
- Blue Canyon Technologies XACT ADCS with Integrated Thruster Control
- SwRI Spacecraft Structure Mechanical and Thermal (SMT)
- NASA JPL/SDL IRIS X-Band Deep Space Transponder
- NASA GSFC Mission Operations Center
- NASA Deep Space Network Ground Communication

== Flight results ==
- After a successful launch of the SLS at 1:47 am EST on November 16 2022, The Orion/ICPS performed a Trans-Lunar Injection and separated.
- Shortly thereafter, CuSP was deployed from its launch canister in the ICPS.
- Twenty-three minutes after deployment, DSN received Open Loop Receiver (OLR) telemetry from CuSP indicated it had booted up, detumbled, deployed solar arrays, and assumed a Sun-pointing orientation.
- It was operating perfectly until...
- OLR monitoring of the radio signal indicated that the transmitter carrier signal vanished after transmitting for 1 hour and 15 minutes.
- No cause has been determined for this end of transmission.
- Multiple attempts to receive additional signals from the spacecraft failed through the end of 2022. No contact was made.
- The CuSP team fully investigated a sudden battery temperature increase and found it was a telemetry failure. This was verified by comparing redundant indications of several parameters. The redundant indications did not show the suspected excursion. This failure was proven to be the failure of a temperature monitor which saturated the ADC inputs of several signals, but not their redundant monitors fed to an independent ADC.
- The CuSP team fully investigated an anomalous high IRIS Radio temperature. JPL IRIS engineers traced it to a failure to update a scaling equation in the SMOC EGSE. Once the updated equation was applied, the temperature fell in line with all others.
- Plans were to make another attempt during an expected focal convergence, however, no further contact attempts were made to contact the spacecraft.
- Official end of mission was declared December 2023.

== Gallery ==
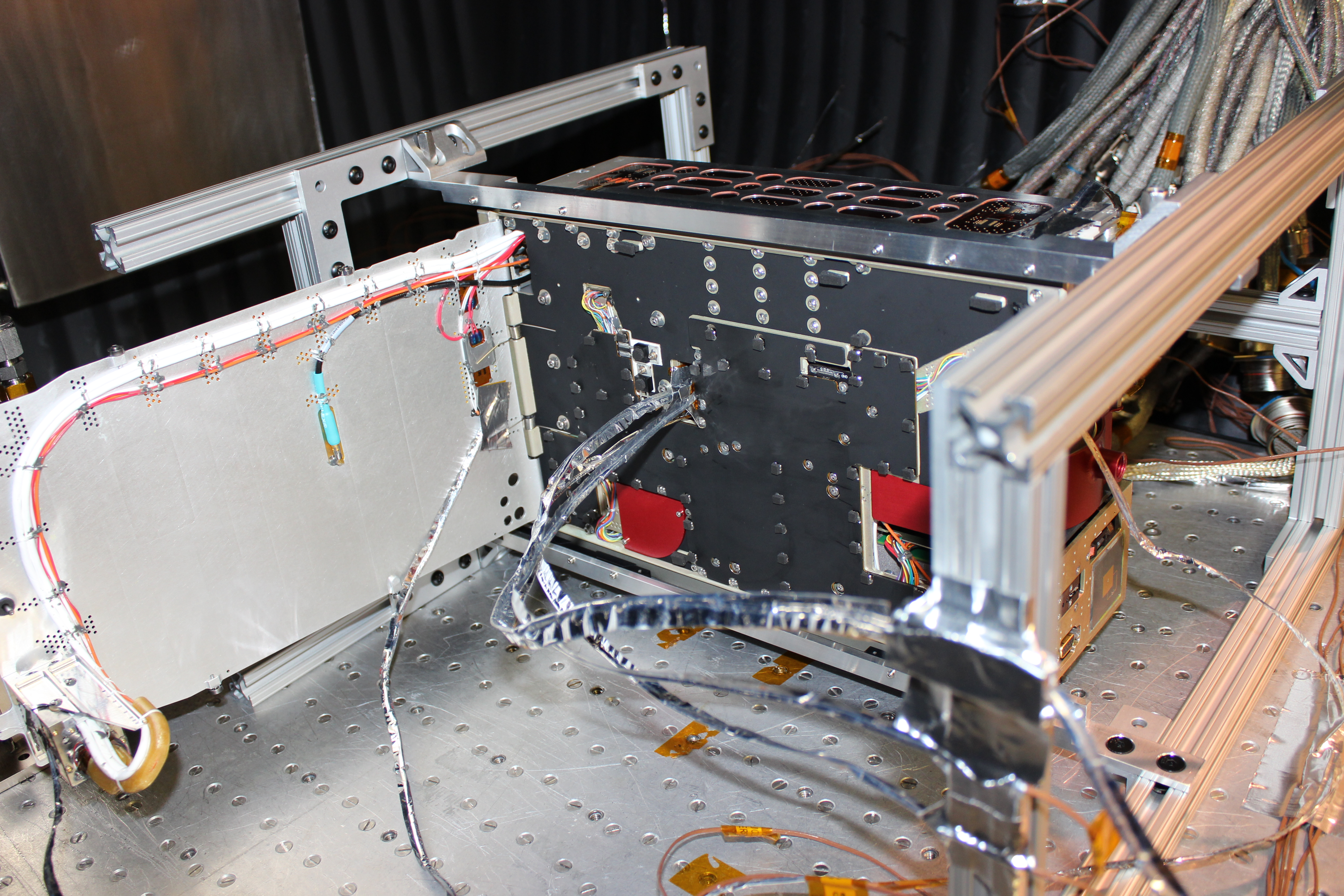
CuSP is instrumented and placed in the Thermal Vacuum Chamber.

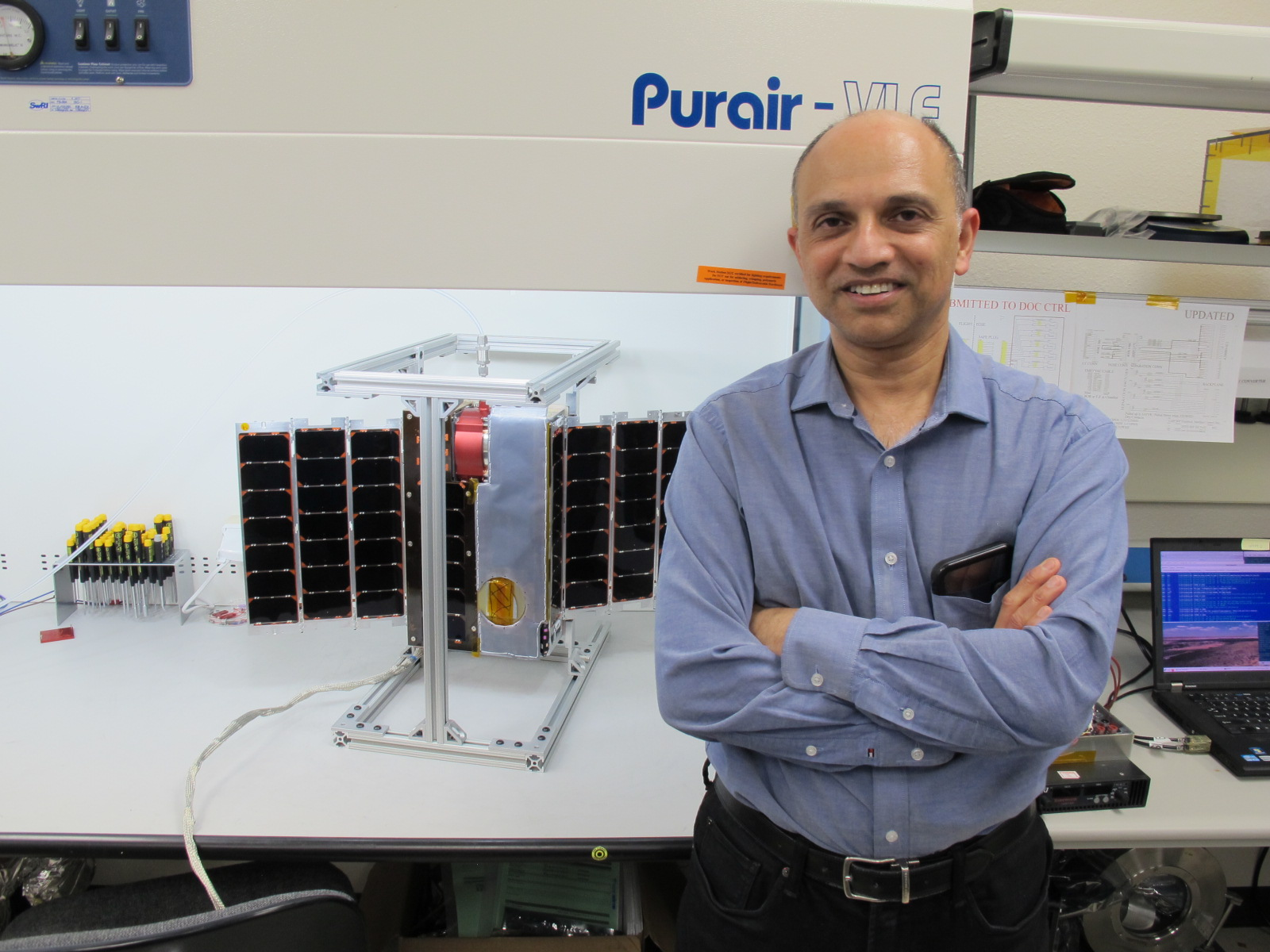
Dr. Mihir Desai, Principal Investigator, seen with CuSP

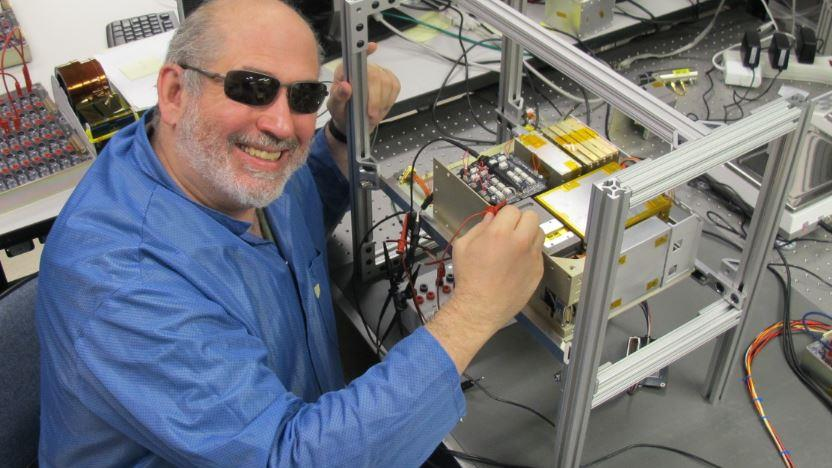
Dr. Don George, Mission Engineer, testing the Electrical Power System (EPS) on CuSP.

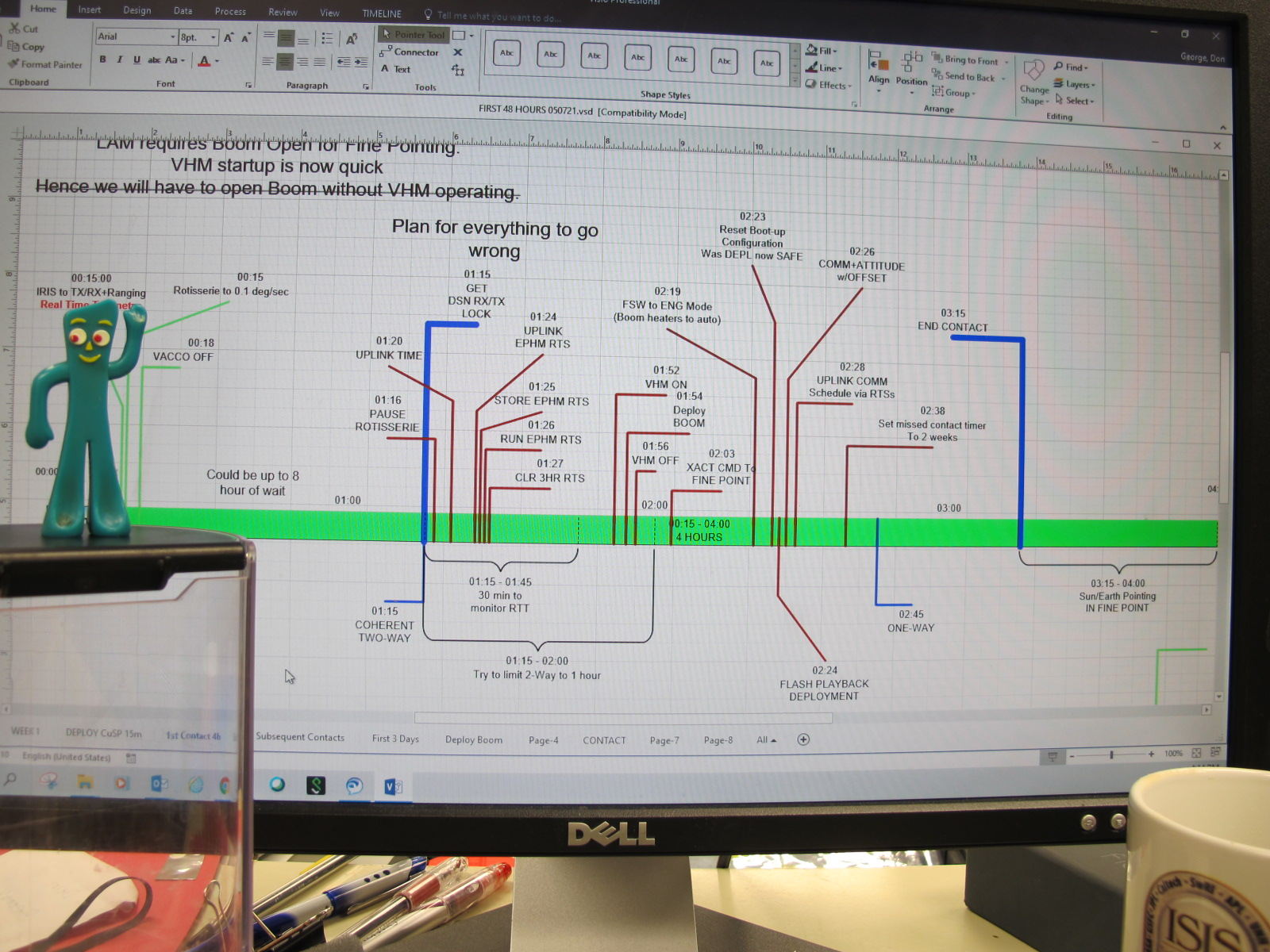
Dr. Gumby presenting the post deployment sequence of operations of CuSP to a NASA review panel.

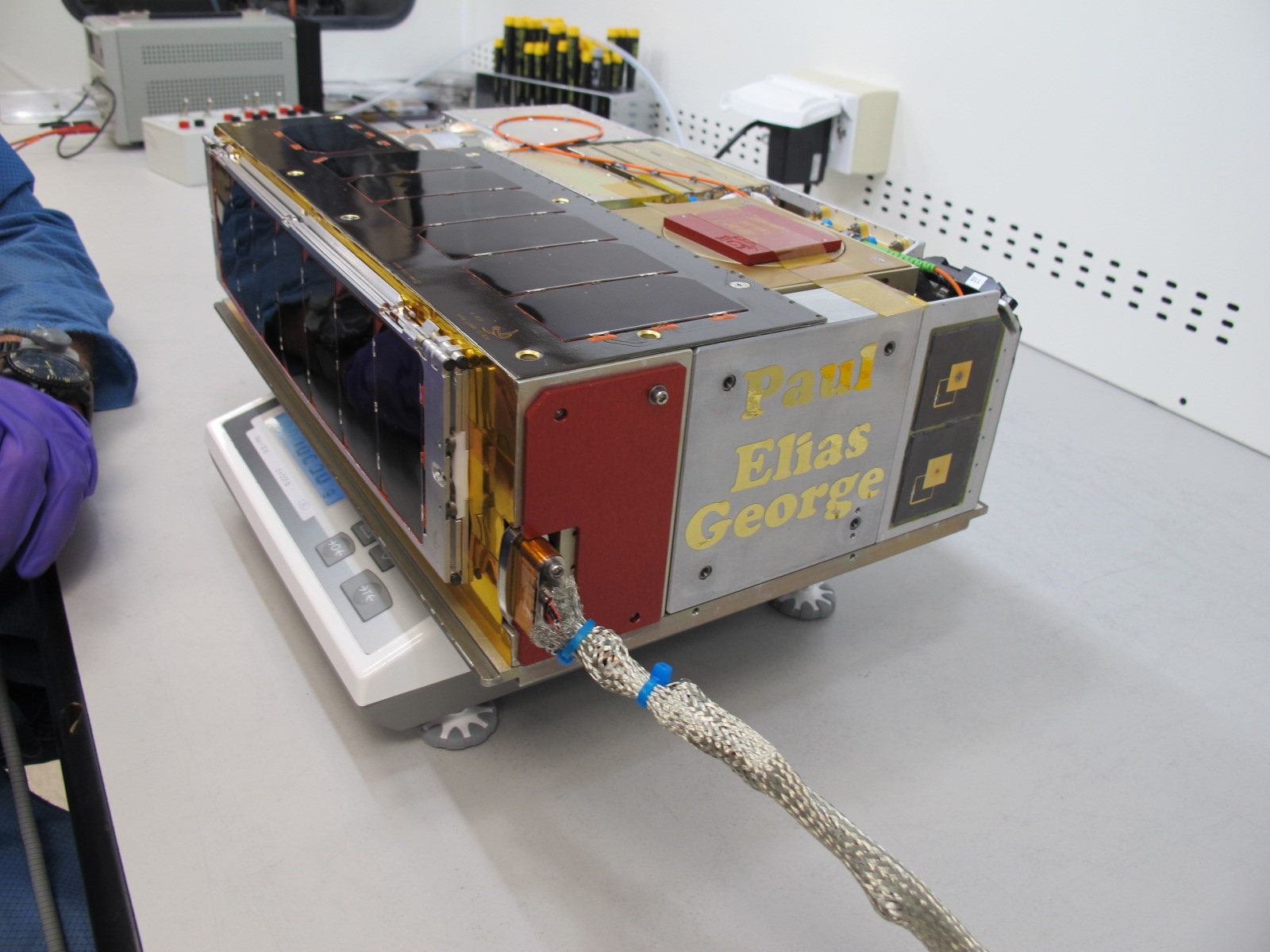
CuSP weighs-in at a 'wet mass' of 10.2 kg, well within the 14 kg mass limit.

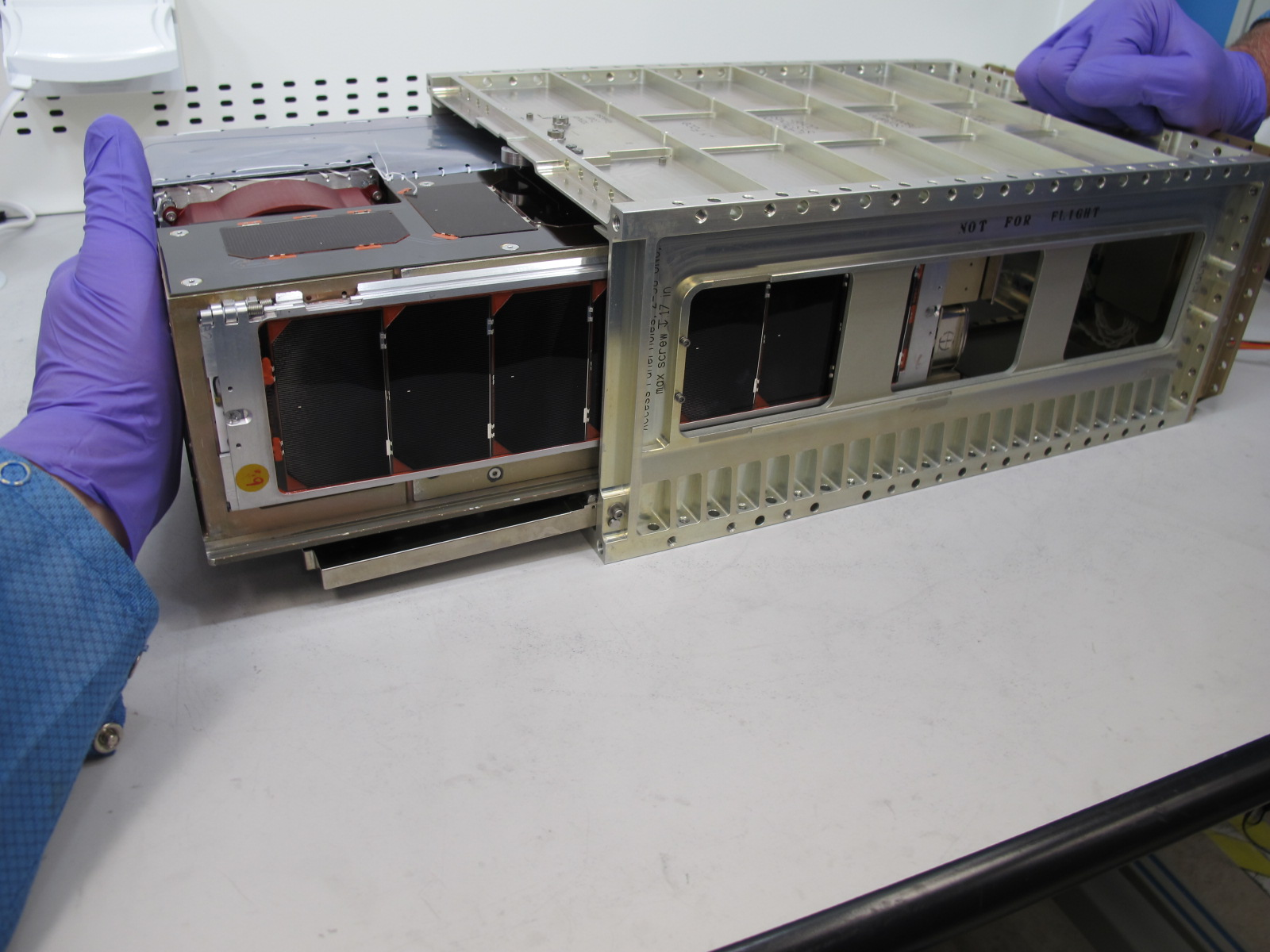
The 'Purple Hands' verify that CuSP fits into its dispenser. This dispenser pushes CuSP out of the launch vehicle.

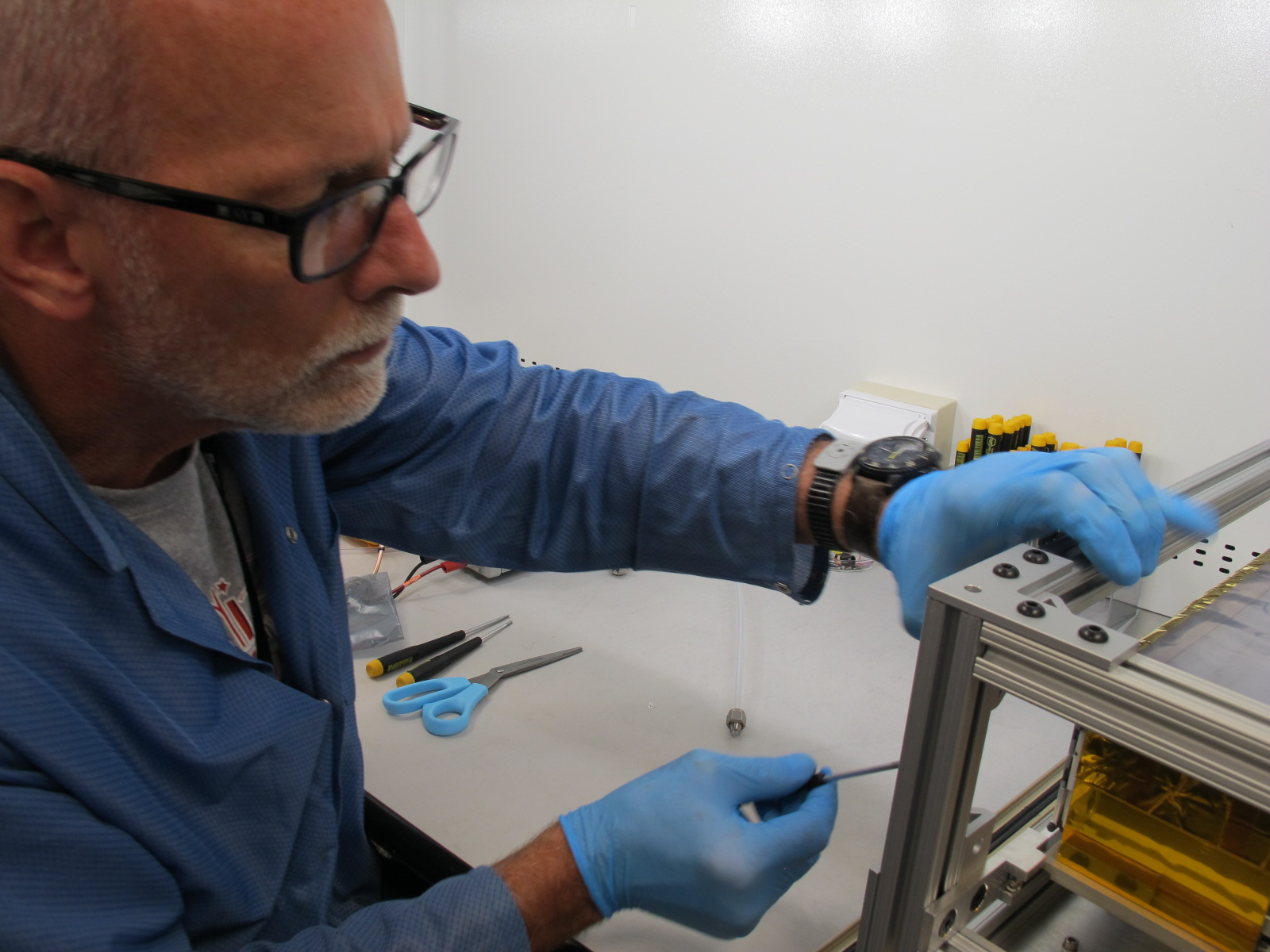
The Principal Technician for CuSP, Raymond Doty, makes final 'Pack and Ship' preparations for CuSP.

== Other Artemis 1 CubeSats ==
- Near-Earth Asteroid Scout by NASA, a solar sail spacecraft that was planned to encounter a near-Earth asteroid (mission failure)
- BioSentinel, an astrobiology mission
- LunIR by Lockheed Martin Space
- Lunar IceCube, by the Morehead State University
- CubeSat for Solar Particles (CuSP)
- Lunar Polar Hydrogen Mapper (LunaH-Map), designed by the Arizona State University
- EQUULEUS, submitted by JAXA and the University of Tokyo
- OMOTENASHI, submitted by JAXA, a lunar lander (mission failure)
- Cislunar Explorers, Cornell University, Ithaca, New York
- Earth Escape Explorer (CU-E^{3}), University of Colorado Boulder
