= World Is Not Enough (spacecraft propulsion) =

Spacecraft propulsion using steam as propellant

The World Is Not Enough (WINE) is a US project developing a refuelable steam engine system for spacecraft propulsion. WINE developed a method of extracting volatiles from ice, ice-rich regolith, and hydrated soils and uses it as steam propulsion which allows the spacecraft to refuel multiple times and have an extraordinary long service lifetime. This would allow a single spacecraft to visit multiple asteroids, comets or several landing locations at an icy world such as the Moon, Mars, Pluto, Enceladus, Ganymede, Europa, etc.

The harvesting and propulsion systems were successfully tested in December 2018 on a small spacecraft prototype under simulated asteroid conditions. WINE is a joint project of Honeybee Robotics, the University of Central Florida, and Embry–Riddle Aeronautical University in Florida.

== Overview ==
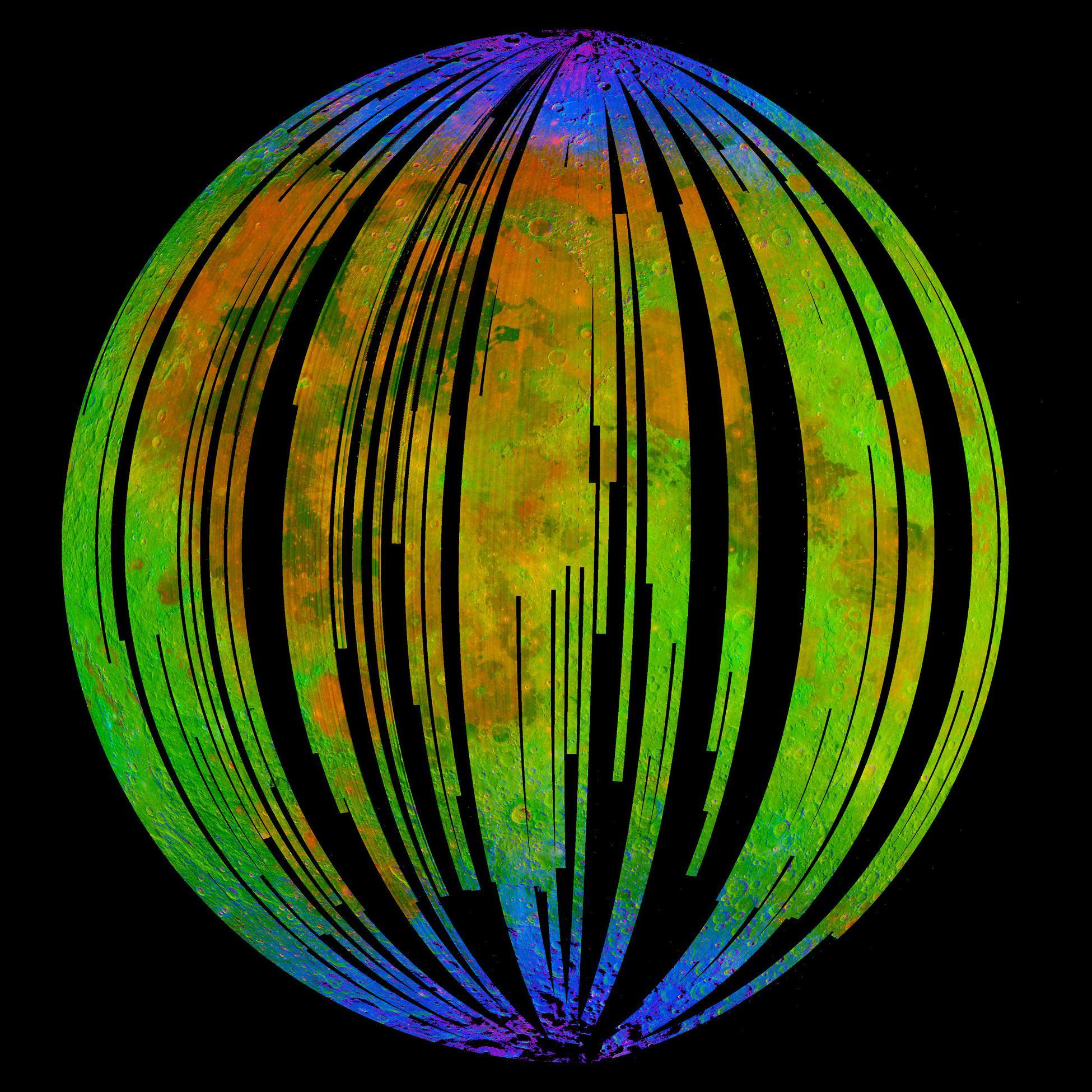
Image of the Moon taken by the Moon Mineralogy Mapper. Blue shows the spectral signature of water.

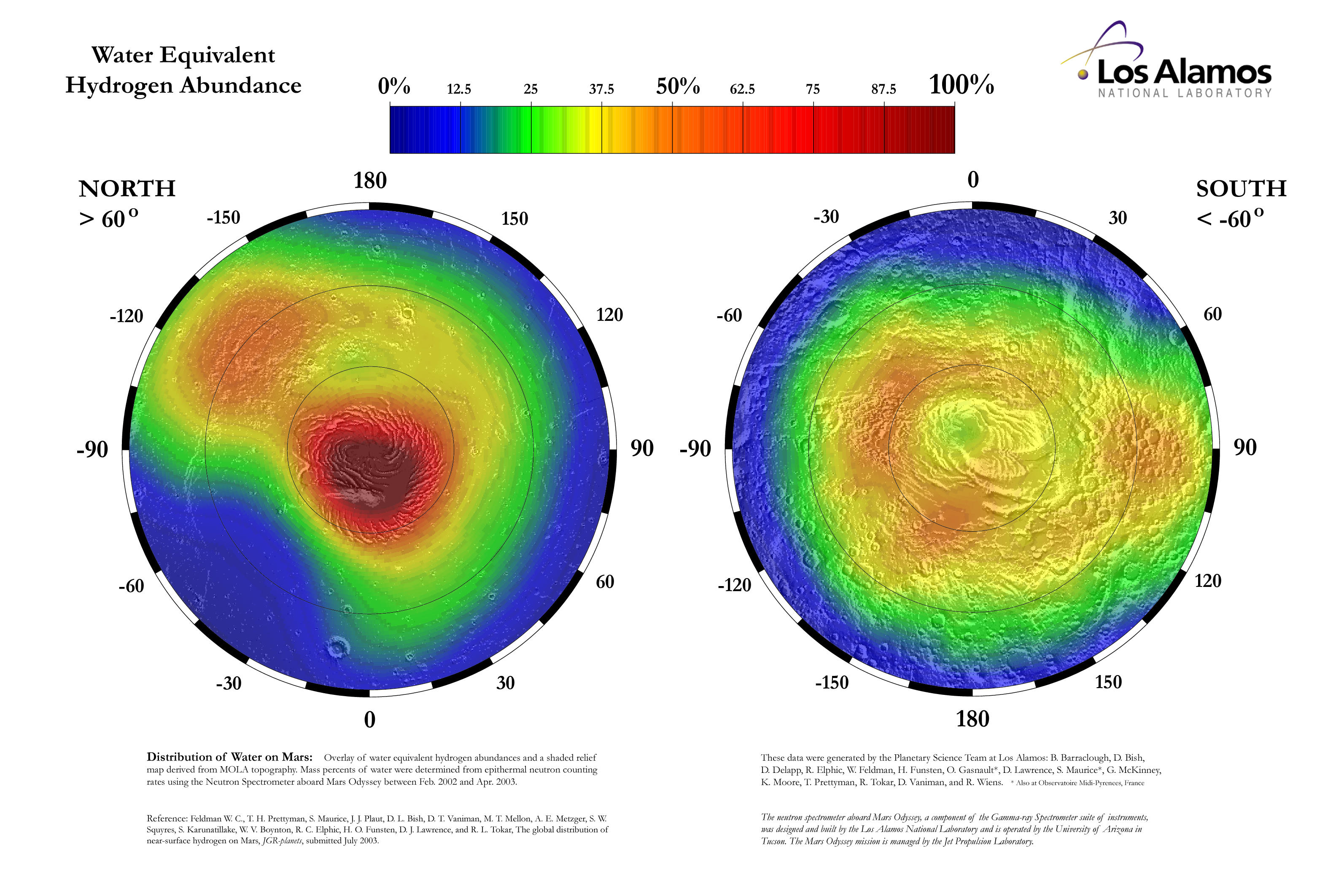
Distribution of water ice present in the upper meter of the Martian surface in the north (left) and south (right) polar regions. The percentages are derived through stoichiometric calculations based on epithermal neutron fluxes. These fluxes were detected by the Neutron Spectrometer aboard the 2001 Mars Odyssey spacecraft.

WINE is a joint project of Honeybee Robotics, the University of Central Florida (UCF), and Embry–Riddle Aeronautical University (ERAU) in Florida, meant to facilitate in situ resource utilization (ISRU) of water as a critical part of sustainable and cost-effective space exploration. WINE was conceived by planetary research scientist Philip Metzger at the University of Central Florida and Kris Zacny of Honeybee Robotics.

The team developed and tested a spacecraft prototype that harvests local water ice "for eternal exploration of space" using steam as propulsion. The system employs a drill to mine and extract water ice from the surface soil (regolith), purify the water, and heat it to be used as compressed steam for propulsion. Refueling can be repeated indefinitely at different icy bodies within the Solar System or at multiple landing sites at icy worlds with low gravity such as Pluto, Enceladus, Europa, and the Moon.

As of January 2019, development and testing are funded by NASA's Small Business Innovation Research program (SIBIR).

== General description ==
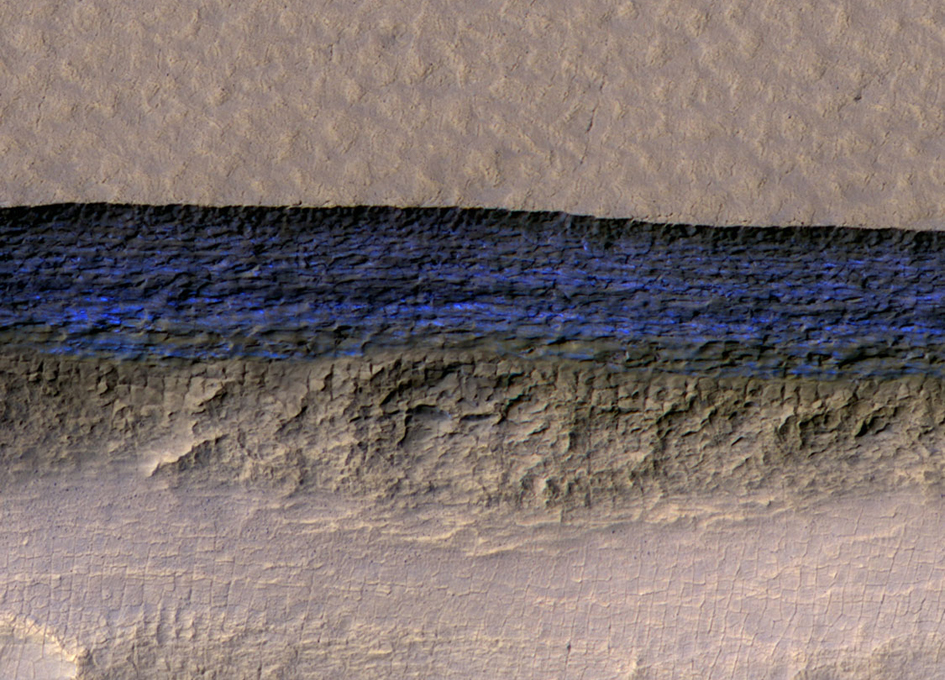
A cross-section of underground water ice in Mars is exposed at the steep slope that appears bright blue in this enhanced-color view from the MRO. The scene is about 500 meters wide. The scarp drops about 128 meters from the level ground. The ice sheets extend from just below the surface to a depth of 100 meters or more.

There are two versions of water harvesters being developed by Honeybee Robotics: the 'Spider System' is for landers meant to "walk" or takeoff again using steam power, and PVEx for large rovers meant to harvest and transport the water for other purposes. The water extracted is stored in a tank, and it can be used for steam propulsion or can be transported elsewhere for other uses.

The Spider Water Extraction System features multiple systems integrated into spacecraft lander legs to provide higher processing volume and system redundancy. It can drill into cemented icy and mineral composites that can be as hard as concrete. The architecture enables each drill to also act as an anchoring force as they sample for water-rich material. The stored water can be heated into steam and used to move the lander's legs as a spider does for walking, or use it as a jet thrust to fly to different landing sites or to travel to multiple icy bodies.

The Planetary Volatiles Extractor (PVEx) is a variant best mounted on a large rover equipped with radioisotope thermoelectric generators. It features a double-walled coring auger with a heated inner wall to extract volatiles from ice, ice-rich regolith, and hydrated soils from icy bodies. The double-wall coring drill penetrates icy material and heats the volatile-rich core, causing water and other volatiles to turn into a gas. This gas is contained in the system and flows into a cold trap, where it condenses into a solid and can be transferred to a storage tank on another vehicle or depot. The system combines mining and extraction into one step. It drills to a target depth, obtains a 5 cm (2.0 in) core sample, heats it up, and captures volatiles in a condenser above the surface. Once extraction is complete, the corer is retracted and the dry regolith core is left behind.

== Testing ==
Initial tests in 2016 were performed in limestone and blocks of ice to evaluate mechanical aspects of the system. The PVEx variant targeted a depth of 50 cm (20 in) in limestone in 10 minutes and a similar depth in −20 °C (−4 °F) ice blocks in 7 minutes. Early performance tests under space analog conditions measured a water extraction efficiency of 87% while requiring extraction energy of 1.7 Whr/g; the needed power is 60 watts for 40 minutes. To harvest 30 kg of water per day, the PVEx corer would need two MMRTG generators. For lower demands, it can use solar panels.

Later in 2016, the team experimented with several mining mechanisms that were adapted to the smaller size of a WINE spacecraft. The mining tests extracted water from lunar regolith simulant that contained ice. The tests also extracted water from asteroid regolith simulant that was physically dry (containing no water or ice), because it released the water that had been locked inside the crystalline structure of its phyllosilicate minerals. Phyllosilicates are abundant in carbonaceous asteroids. This extracted asteroidal water was found to contain large amounts of dissolved carbon dioxide, metals, and organic matter due to the bulk composition of the simulated asteroid, but the team did not consider this a hindrance to steam propulsion. Based on the results, they selected the PVEX corer for additional development in an integrated WINE prototype.

The team successfully tested the integrated prototype on 31 December 2018 under simulated outer space conditions of vacuum and low temperature while harvesting frozen water from simulated asteroid regolith. Within minutes, the microwave-sized spacecraft extracted the water from hydrated artificial regolith and took off within the vacuum chamber using steam thrusters.

The system components are expected to reach technology readiness level 5 (TRL 5) in 2019. Although the research is funded by NASA, this water-harvesting system is available to private companies to use it on asteroids, comets, the Moon, Ceres, Europa, Titan, Pluto, the poles of Mercury, or anywhere there is water and sufficiently low gravity.

== Power ==
The spacecraft uses deployable solar panels to generate electrical energy for mining and making steam, or it could use radioisotope thermoelectric generators (RTG) to extend the potential reach of these planetary hoppers to Pluto and other locations far from the Sun. The water is heated and allowed to escape as pressurized steam through a propelling nozzle to produce thrust. Alternatively, the steam is used to initiate mechanical movement as a steam engine.

== See also ==
- Asteroidal water
- Lunar water
- Spacecraft propulsion
- Steam rocket
- Water on Mars
- Water on terrestrial planets of the Solar System
