= Lunar Polar Hydrogen Mapper =

US Moon-orbiting ice-finding satellite

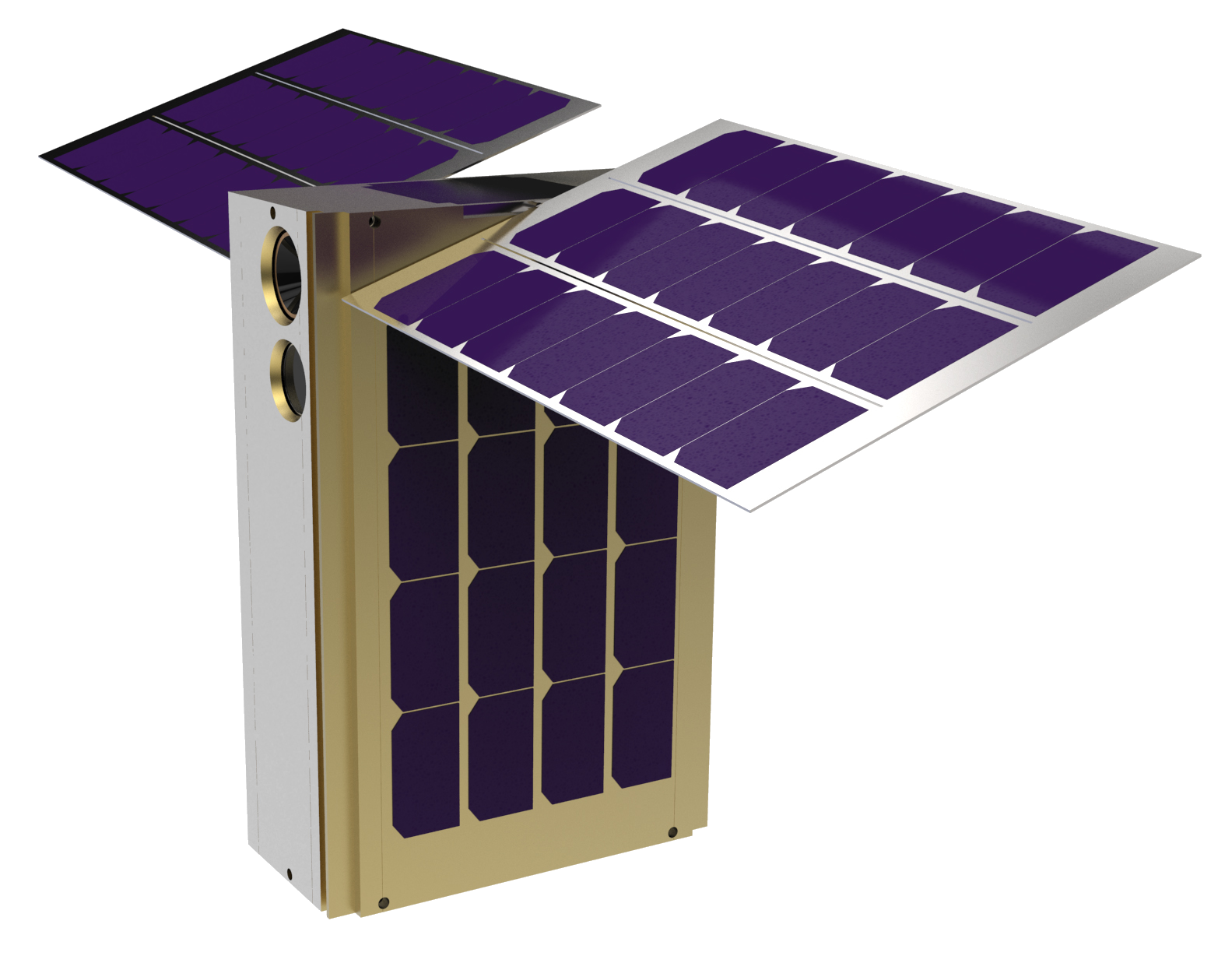
- Rendering of the LunaH-Map spacecraft
- Names: LunaH-Map
- Mission type: Lunar orbiter
- Operator: Arizona State University
- COSPAR ID: 2022-156J
- SATCAT no.: 57685
- Website: lunahmap.asu.edu
- Mission duration: 96 days (planned); 6 months (final)

Spacecraft properties
- Spacecraft: LunaH-Map
- Spacecraft type: CubeSat
- Bus: 6U CubeSat
- Manufacturer: Arizona State University
- Launch mass: 14 kg (31 lb)
- Dimensions: 10 cm × 20 cm × 30 cm (3.9 in × 7.9 in × 11.8 in)

Start of mission
- Launch date: 16 November 2022, 06:47:44 UTC
- Rocket: SLS Block 1
- Launch site: KSC, LC-39B
- Contractor: NASA

End of mission
- Declared: 8 August 2023
- Last contact: May 2023

Orbital parameters
- Reference system: Selenocentric orbit (planned, never achieved)
- Regime: Polar orbit
- Periselene altitude: 5 km (3.1 mi)
- Inclination: 90°
- Period: 10 hours
- LunaH-Map mission logo Small Innovative Missions for Planetary Exploration (SIMPLEx) Program

Lunar Polar Hydrogen Mapper, or LunaH-Map, was one of the 10 CubeSats launched with Artemis 1 on 16 November 2022.

Along with Lunar IceCube and LunIR, LunaH-Map was to help investigate the possible presence of water-ice on the Moon.

Arizona State University began development of LunaH-Map after being awarded a contract by NASA in early 2015. The development team consisted of about 20 professionals and students led by Craig Hardgrove, the principal investigator.

The mission was a part of NASA's SIMPLEx program.

Probably due to months of launch delays of the Artemis I spacecraft after CubeSats had already been installed on its rocket, the propulsion system failed to fire when needed to insert the probe into lunar orbit. The satellite thus failed its primary science mission, but successfully demonstrated its neutron spectrometer technology, which will be used on future missions.

== Objective ==
LunaH-Map's primary objective was to map the abundance of hydrogen down to one meter beneath the surface of the lunar south pole. It was intended to be inserted into a polar orbit around the Moon, with its periselene located near the lunar south pole, initially passing above Shackleton crater. LunaH-Map will provide a high resolution map of the abundance and distribution of hydrogen rich compounds, like water, in this region of the Moon and expand on the less accurate maps made by previous missions. This information may then be used to improve scientific understanding of how water is created and spread throughout the Solar System or used by future crewed missions for life support and fuel production.

Results from LunaH-Map, along with other long distance CubeSat missions like Mars Cube One, are being used to inform the design of future interplanetary CubeSats.

== Background ==
LunaH-Map was conceived in a discussion between Craig Hardgrove and a LunaH-Map chief engineer, Jekan Thanga, about issues with the spatial resolution of various neutron detectors in use around Mars. Instruments like Dynamic Albedo of Neutrons on the Curiosity rover can only make measurements of about 3 m (9.8 ft) in radius from between the rear wheels of the rover, while on orbit neutron detectors, like the High Energy Neutron Detector on the 2001 Mars Odyssey probe, can only provide large, inaccurate maps over hundreds of square kilometers. Similar issues were present in contemporary maps of hydrogen distributions on the Moon, so Hardgrove designed LunaH-Map to orbit closer to the lunar south pole than previous crafts to improve the resolution of these maps.

By April 2015, Hardgrove had assembled a team composed of members of various government, academic, and private institutions and drafted a proposal to NASA. In early 2015, LunaH-Map was one of two CubeSats chosen by NASA's Science Mission Directorate through the Small Innovative Missions for Planetary Exploration (SIMPLEx) program, along with Q-PACE.

== Hardware ==
Because of the scope of this mission, several unique challenges needed to be addressed in implementing hardware. Typical low Earth orbit (LEO) CubeSats can use off-the-shelf hardware, or parts available commercially for other uses, but because LunaH-Map was intended to run longer and travel further than most LEO CubSat missions, commercial parts could not be expected to perform reliably for the mission duration unmodified. Also, unlike most conventional CubeSats, LunaH-Map needed to navigate to its desired orbit after leaving the launch vehicle, so it needed to be equipped with its own propulsion system.

The primary science instrument was a scintillation neutron detector composed of elpasolite (Cs_{2}YLiCl_{6}:Ce or CLYC). This material is a scintillator, which measurably glows when it interacts with thermal and epithermal neutrons. LunaH-Map's neutron detector will consist of an array of eight 2.5 × 2.5 × 2 cm CLYC scintillators.

Multiple new technologies were tested by LunaH-Map in addition to its primary instrument. The CubeSat was equipped with a Busek-built ion thruster powered by Iodine fuel. The iodine was stored in a solid form.

Auto navigation software and a new method for determining spacecraft locations using DSN were also tested during the mission.

== Mission ==
On 16 November 2022 (3 years ago), LunaH-Map launched with Artemis 1 from Kennedy Space Center. It was deployed from the Orion Stage Adapter 5 hours and 33 minutes after launch. Ground controllers were able to contact the CubeSat soon after using NASA's Deep Space Network. They began commissioning spacecraft systems but ran into problems with the propulsion system. As a result LunaH-Map did not perform the maneuver as scheduled during its lunar flyby on 21 November 2022.

In spite of the fault with the propulsion system, LunaH-Map returned some data, including neutrons detected during its flyby, and high-altitude images of the moon taken with its star tracker. As of November 2022, NASA was planning to conduct an auto-navigation experiment and ranging tests with the Deep Space Network.

In January 2023, the spacecraft missed a second opportunity for lunar orbital insertion, and it was then considered for a near-Earth asteroid mission. Six months of attempts to unstick the propulsion valve by heating it failed, and in May 2023, NASA finally decided to cease mission operations altogether. The spacecraft entered a stable orbit around the Sun.

The neutron spectrometer technology successfully demonstrated by LunaH-Map was planned for inclusion on Lunar Vulkan Imaging and Spectroscopy Explorer (Lunar-VISE).

== See also ==
- Artemis 1 § Cubesats

== Bibliography ==
- The Lunar Polar Hydrogen Mapper mission: Mapping hydrogen distribution in permanently shadowed regions of the Moon's South Pole (Presentation to Lunar Exploration Analysis Group, 2015)
