= AVCOAT =

Heat dissipating material

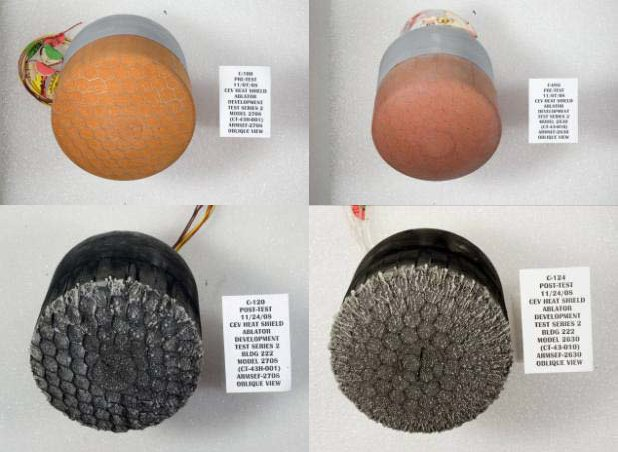
Apollo and Orion Avcoat

AVCOAT 5026-39 is a NASA code for several versions of a specific ablative heat shield material originally created by Avco for the Apollo program. It is composed of silica fibers in an epoxy novolac resin. The original AVCOAT was used for the Apollo Command Module heat shield. A reformulated version was used for the initial Orion heat shield and later for a redesigned Orion heat shield.

== History ==
AVCOAT was used for the heat shield on NASA's Apollo command module. In its final Apollo form, this material was called AVCOAT 5026–39.

Although AVCOAT was not used for the Space Shuttle orbiters, NASA again used the material for its Orion spacecraft first for the initial Orion test and then for a different type of heat shield for the later Orions. The Avcoat used on the two types of Orion shield was reformulated to meet environmental legislation that was enacted after the end of Apollo.

== Specifications ==
- Material: epoxy phenol formaldehyde resin with special additives originally for use in a fiberglass honeycomb matrix.
- Density: 32 pounds per cubic foot (0.51 g/cm^{3})
- Post-ablation char-layer composition: 6.7 pounds per cubic foot (0.107 g/cm^{3}) of carbon and 8 pounds per cubic foot (0.13 g/cm^{3}) of silica.

== AVCOAT-based heat shields ==
=== Apollo Command Module ===
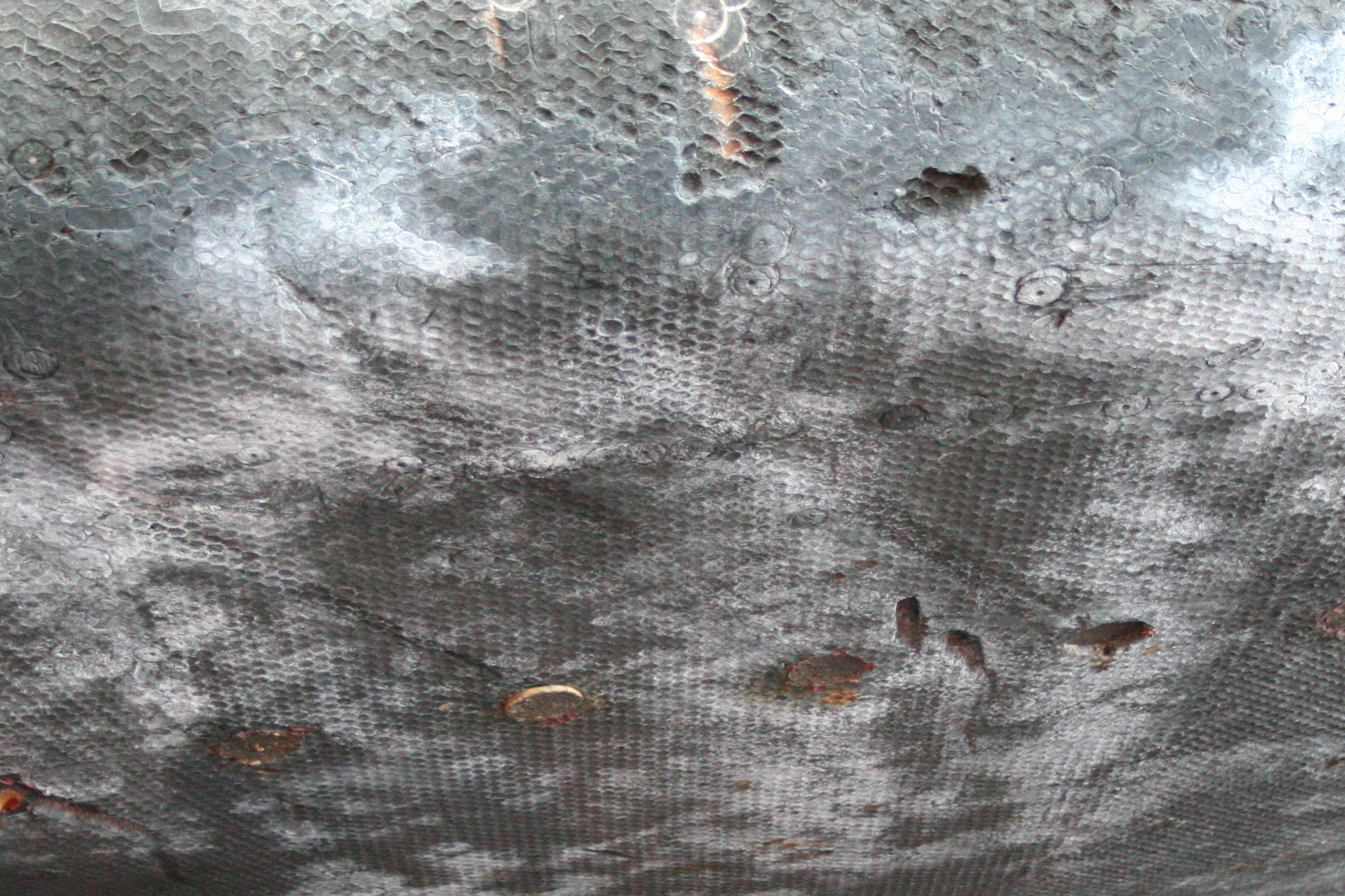
Ablative heat shield (after use) on Apollo 12 capsule

AVCOAT was first used on the parts of the Apollo spacecraft orbiter and as a unit attached to the crew module. The heat shield is a honeycomb structure filled with the AVCOAT. NASA confirmed that this is made of silica fibers with an epoxy novolac resin filled in a fiberglass-phenolic manufactured directly onto the heat shield. The paste-like material was gunned into each of the 330,000 cells of the fiberglass honeycomb individually, a process taking about six months.

NASA's Apollo Flight Test Analysis, AVCOAT 5026-39/HC-G material was tested on the nose cone of a Pacemaker sounding rocket. The temperature and ablation measurements were made at four locations on the nose cap. The report noted that the wear of the shield is due to the aerodynamic shear and heating rate. The report also noted that scientists believed that the ablation was done in a controlled manner.

=== Orion EFT-1 Crew Module ===
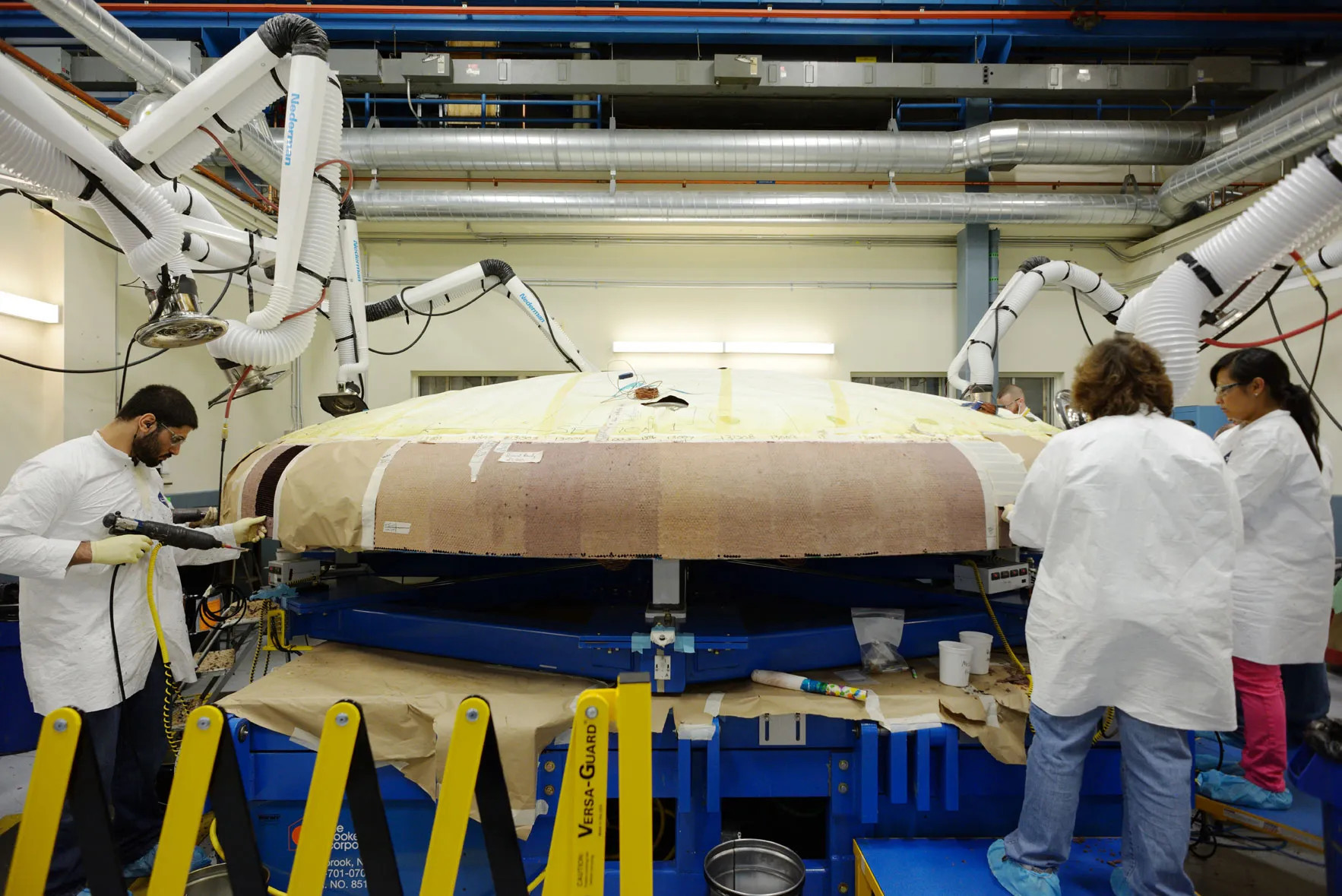
Technicians working on the EFT-1 heat shield

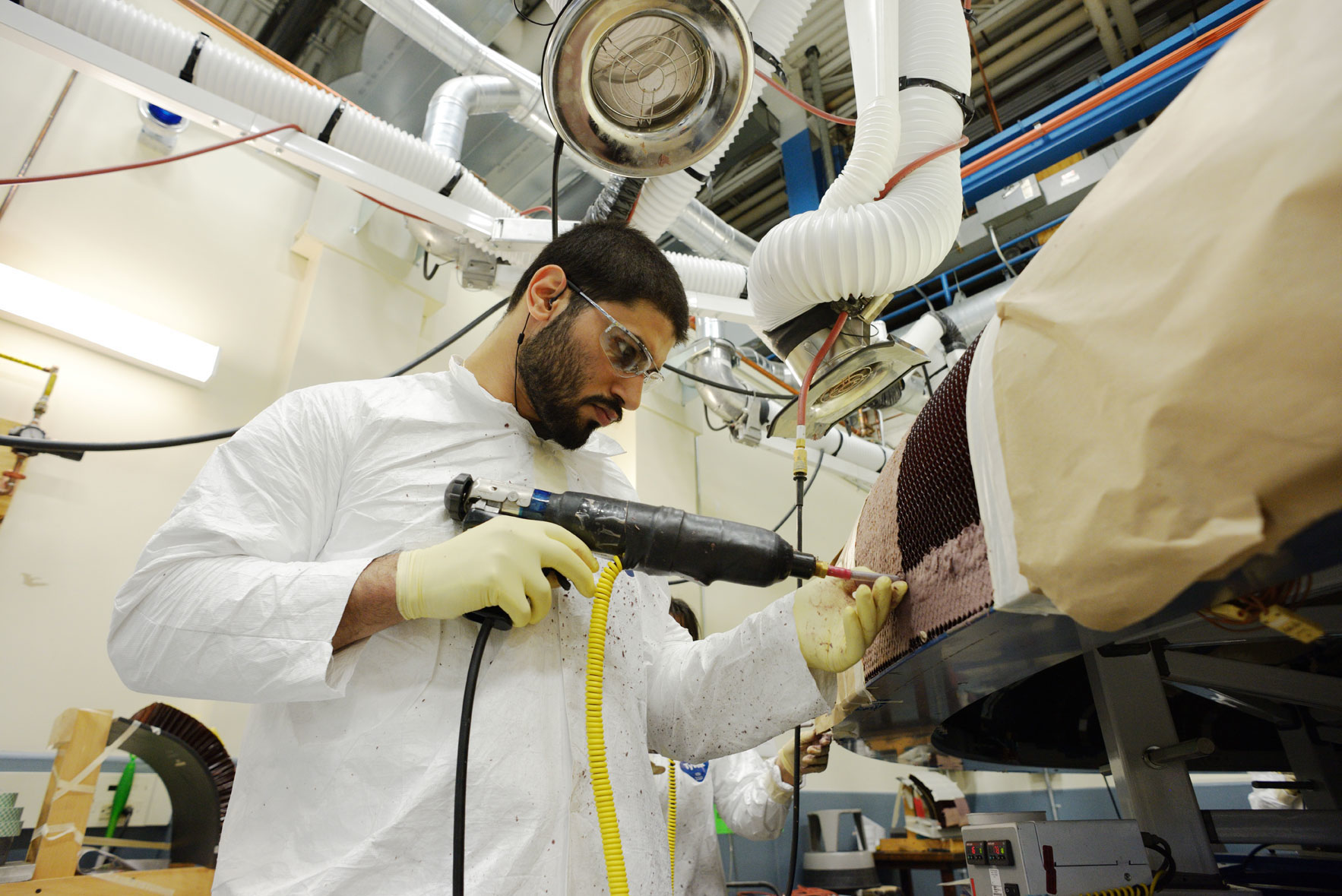
Technician injecting AVCOAT into the heat shield honeycomb

To protect the Crew Module during Earth re-entry, the dish shaped AVCOAT heat shield ablator system was selected. NASA announced that this module would encounter temperature as high as 5,000 degrees Fahrenheit (2760 °C). Licensed by Textron, AVCOAT material is produced at New Orleans's Michoud Assembly Facility by Lockheed Martin. This ablative heat shield was installed at the base of the crew module to provide a controlled erosion moving heat away from the crew module into the atmosphere.

John Kowal, Orion's thermal protections systems manager at Johnson Space Center, discussed the biggest challenge with AVCOAT has been reviving the technology for manufacturing with similar performance as demonstrated in the Apollo Missions. After the Apollo missions, Avcoat variants were produced and studied. Orion Chief Engineer requested the heat shield to be redesigned, however the final design was not selected.

The Orion Crew Module was first designed for the NASA's Constellation program. The heat shield was designed and manufactured similarly to the Apollo version as a monolithic fiberglass honeycomb which was then filled with the AVCOAT. The honey comb consisted of 330,000 small cells. Each cell was individually filled with AVCOAT one at a time by a technician with a pressure gun, with the process taking more than six months for the shield.

The EFT-1 mission performed two orbits of Earth providing the opportunity for Orion's systems to be tested. It took about four hours with the splash down in the ocean. This was the only flight with this heat shield.

=== Orion Artemis Crew Module ===
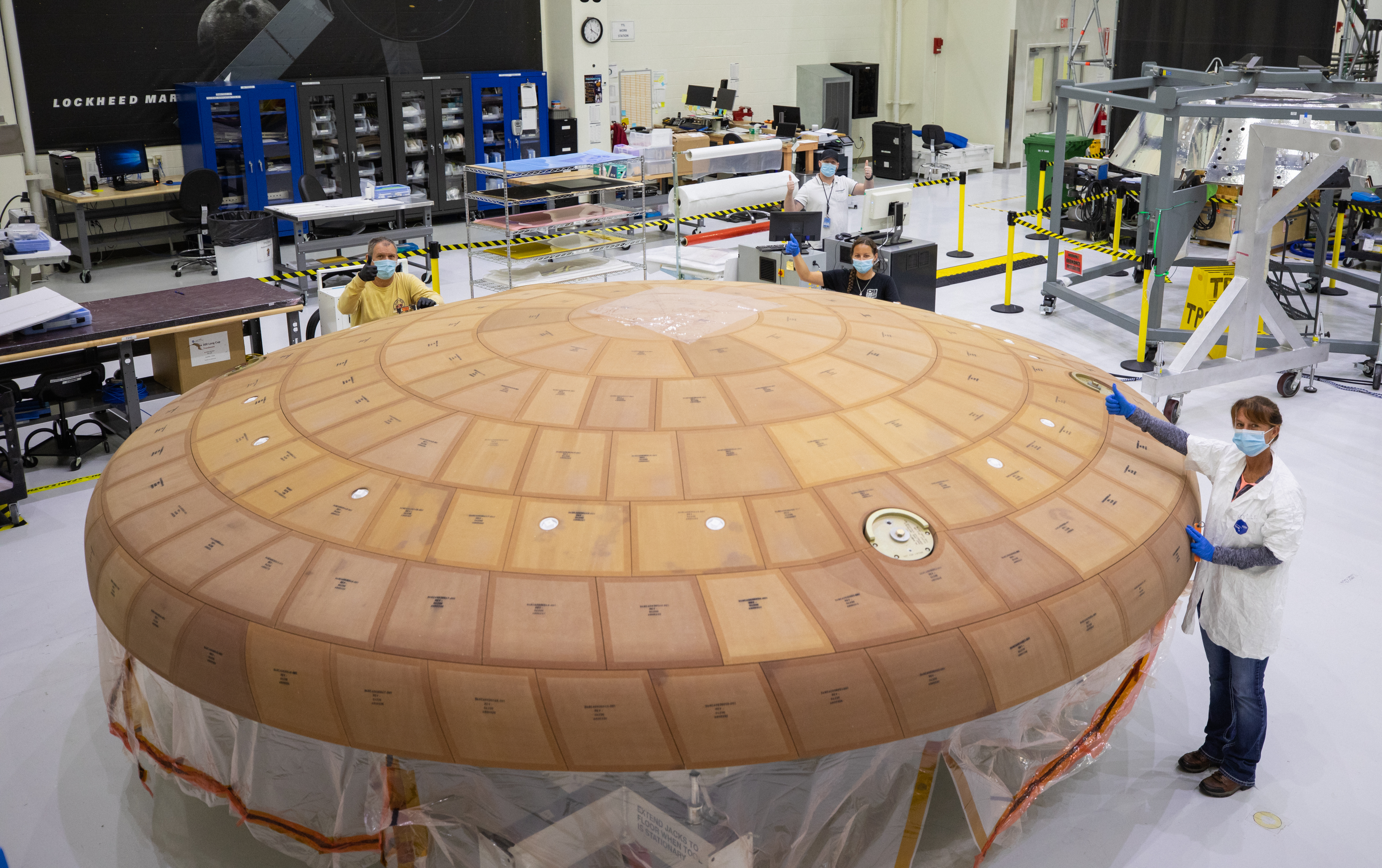
ASRC Federal technicians inspect AVCOAT block bonding on the Artemis II heat shield on at Kennedy Space Center on July 2, 2020.

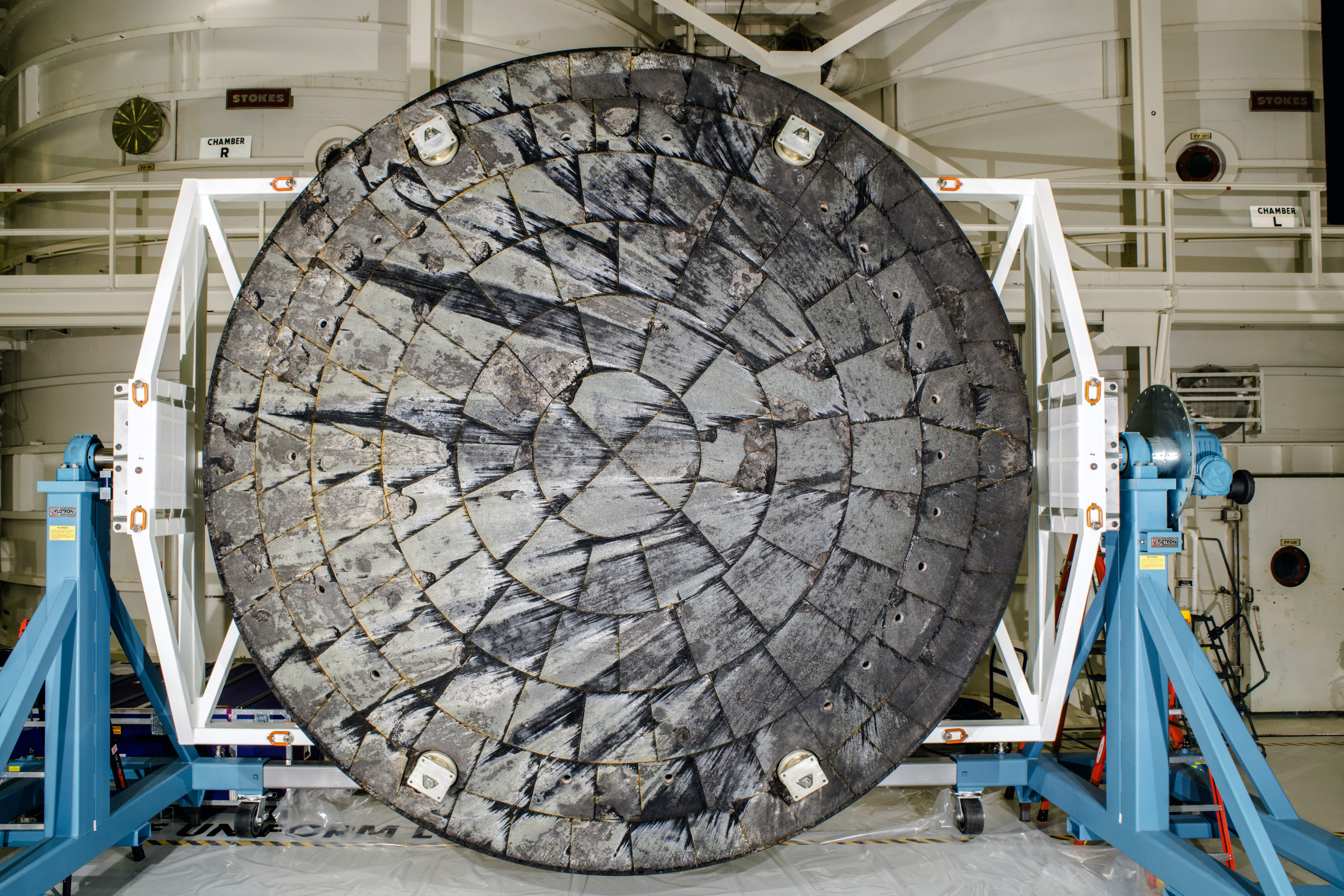
Artemis I heat shield showing spalling after recovery

After the end of the Constellation program, Orion was adapted for use with the Space Launch System to replace the Space Shuttle program. This spacecraft was planned to take astronauts to the International Space Station (ISS) in 2015 and to the moon in 2024. However, Orion was never used for ISS. Its first flight after EFT-1 was the uncrewed Artemis I, which flew in 2022.

Manufacture of the EFT-1 heat shield was labor-intensive and there were concerns that the monolithic honeycomb design was inappropriate for the large Orion shield. Therefore, the shield was redesigned to use carefully shaped Avcoat blocks instead.

The AVCOAT material heat shield went through several rounds of testing before being chosen for the installation. During the investigation of the thermochemical response of Avcoat TPS (based on first principles for comparison with EFT-1 data), things being tested on the heat-shield included: modeling of gas transport, heat transfer, and TPS material regression.

Orion's 16.5 feet AVCOAT heat shield was secured onto the Orion Crew Module using 68 bolts by Technicians at NASA's Kennedy Space Center (KSC) in Florida. This heat shield is covered in titanium truss and a composite substitute with an addition skin made of carbon fiber layers. Orion's heat-shield was designed and manufactured by Lockheed Martin. The heat shield is like pieces of a puzzle that all must fit together perfectly and the bolt fittings must be lined up.

After the heat-shield's installation, access to components of the crew module became difficult or impossible without its removal.

==== Artemis I heat shield performance ====
After the Artemis I Orion capsule was recovered, inspection showed unexpected loss of material from the heat shield. NASA undertook an exhaustive and complex analysis of the loss, and was finally able to report on it and announce recommendations after two years, on December 5, 2024. The conclusion was that the damage was initiated by spalling caused when gas trapped within the shield heated and then expanded when external pressure was reduced, blowing pieces out of the shield. This occurred during the reentry "skip" maneuver, which had a different heating and cooling profile than simpler direct-entry profiles.

==== Later Artemis missions ====
Based on the Artemis I analysis, NASA decided to use the already-installed identical heat shield for the Artemis II mission, but to fly with a different re-entry profile that would not allow the external pressure to be reduced. Since the Artemis III shield was not yet installed, NASA chose to change the AVCOAT formulation for it. This revised formulation will not trap gasses within the shield, and this in turn allows the capsule to use the preferred reentry skip maneuver.

== Flight use ==
=== Uncrewed ===
- Several subscale test flights
- AS-201
- AS-202
- Apollo 4
- Apollo 6
- EFT-1
- Artemis 1

=== Crewed ===
- Apollo 7, Apollo 8, Apollo 9, Apollo 10
- Apollo 11, Apollo 12, Apollo 13, Apollo 14
- Apollo 15, Apollo 16, Apollo 17
- Skylab 2, Skylab 3, Skylab 4
- Apollo–Soyuz Test Project
- Artemis II

== See also ==
- Phenolic-impregnated carbon ablator
