= Distant retrograde orbit =

Type of spacecraft orbit

The Earth–Moon Lagrange points

In orbital mechanics, a distant retrograde orbit (DRO) is a highly stable retrograde orbit around the smaller of two bodies, passing outside the system's L_{1} and L_{2} Lagrange points.

It is typically discussed in spacecraft orbits of natural satellites. The craft orbit is retrograde: moving in the direction opposite to the direction in which the moon orbits the planet. The orbit is distant: it passes above the Lagrange points, rather than being near the moon. Considering more distant orbits, the synodic period gets longer and approaches that of the moon going around the planet. The sidereal period can become much longer than the moon's orbital period. A hypothetical example with Europa has a sidereal period about eight times the orbital period of Europa.

DROs have been researched for several decades. In April 2022, CNSA's Chang'e 5 orbiter became the first to enter the orbit, followed by NASA's Orion Spacecraft during the Artemis 1 mission which entered in November 2022. Two more CNSA spacecraft, DRO A and B, attempted in 2024, but were left in lower orbits due to a failure of the YZ-1S upper stage. Despite the earlier problems, by August 2024 the DRO A and B appeared to have reached their orbit.

The stability of a DRO is defined in mathematical terms as having very high Lyapunov stability, where an equilibrium orbit is "locally stable if all solutions which start near the point remain near that point for all time".

== List of objects in distant retrograde orbit ==
=== Chang'e 5 orbiter ===
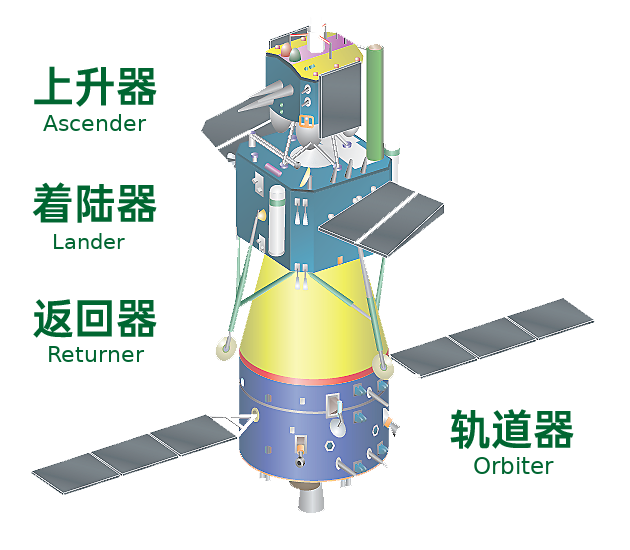
Chang'e 5 spacecraft with orbiter at bottom

After dropping off return samples for Earth, China's Chang'e 5 (CE-5) orbiter first moved to Sun-Earth Lagrange point 1 (L1) in March 2021 for solar observations. In January 2022, CE-5 left L1 point for the lunar distant retrograde orbit (DRO) to conduct very-long-baseline interferometry tests in preparation for the next stage of China's lunar exploration program. According to The Space Review (TSR), this maneuver was depicted in Chinese government and academic documents. In February 2022, multiple amateur satellite trackers observed CE-5 had entered DRO, making it the first spacecraft in history to utilize the orbit.

=== Orion spacecraft ===
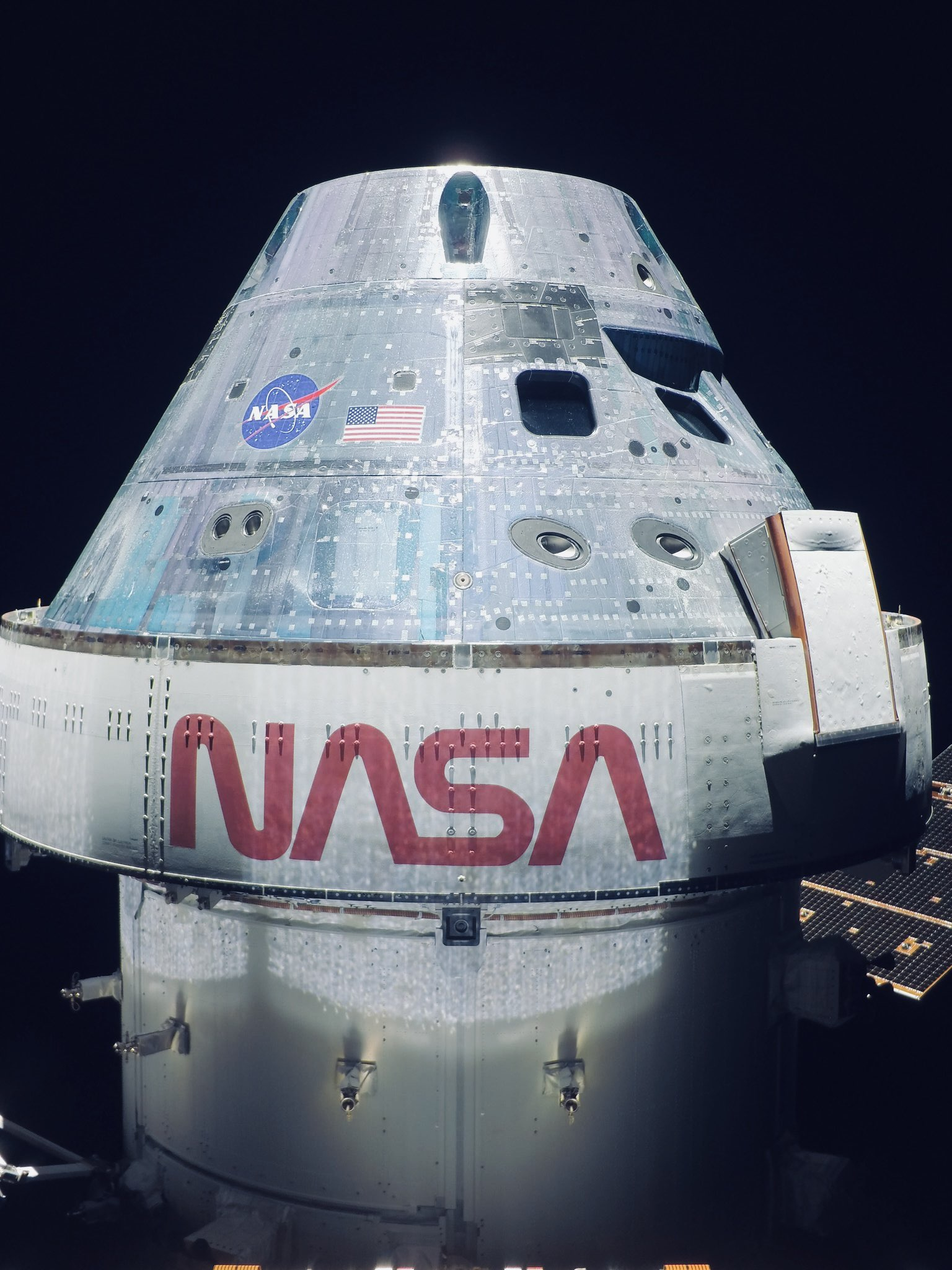
Orion spacecraft prior to arriving at the Moon, where it would later get into DRO

On 16 November 2022, the Space Launch System was launched from Complex 39B as part of the Artemis 1 mission carrying Orion to the Moon. On 25 November it entered DRO and orbited the Moon in that orbit.

=== DRO A/B ===
In March 2024 the China Academy of Sciences launched two uncrewed spacecraft, DRO A and DRO B, but the Yuanzheng-1S upper stage failed to deliver them into the correct orbit. The satellites, which were not part of the Chinese Lunar Exploration Program, were intended to test distant retrograde orbits. Tracking data appeared to show China was attempting to salvage the spacecraft, and by August they appeared to have reached their desired orbit.

== Space concepts proposed to use a DRO ==
=== Jupiter Icy Moons Orbiter ===
A distant retrograde orbit was one of the proposed orbits around Europa for the Jupiter Icy Moons Orbiter—principally for its projected stability and low-energy transfer characteristics—but that mission concept was cancelled in 2005.

=== Asteroid Redirect Mission ===
A distant retrograde orbit was considered for the Asteroid Redirect Mission proposed in 2013. Although the mission was cancelled in 2017, the research done with DRO in mind led to the orbit being used for Artemis I.

=== NASA Lunar Gateway ===
Two system requirements for the NASA Lunar Gateway, as published in the Baseline DSG-RQMT-001 published in June 2019, mention the use of lunar DROs. Requirement L2-GW-0029, Single Orbit Transfer, states "the Gateway shall be capable of performing a single round trip transfer to Distant Retrograde Orbit (DRO) and back within 11 months". Requirement L2-GW-0026, Propulsion System Capability, states "the Gateway shall provide a fuel capacity that would support performing a minimum of two round-trip uncrewed low-energy cislunar orbit transfers between a near-rectilinear halo orbit (NRHO) and a distant retrograde orbit (DRO) and orbit maintenance for a period of 15 years between refueling". Although the selected orbit for the Gateway has been confirmed to be NRHO instead of DRO.

== DRO orbits in fiction ==
In the 2019 Daniel Suarez novel Delta-v, a 560-tonne crewed asteroid-mining ship Konstantin is constructed in a lunar DRO approximately 40,000 km (25,000 mi) above the Moon.

== See also ==
- Free-return trajectory
