= Artemis I =

2022 uncrewed Moon-orbiting NASA mission

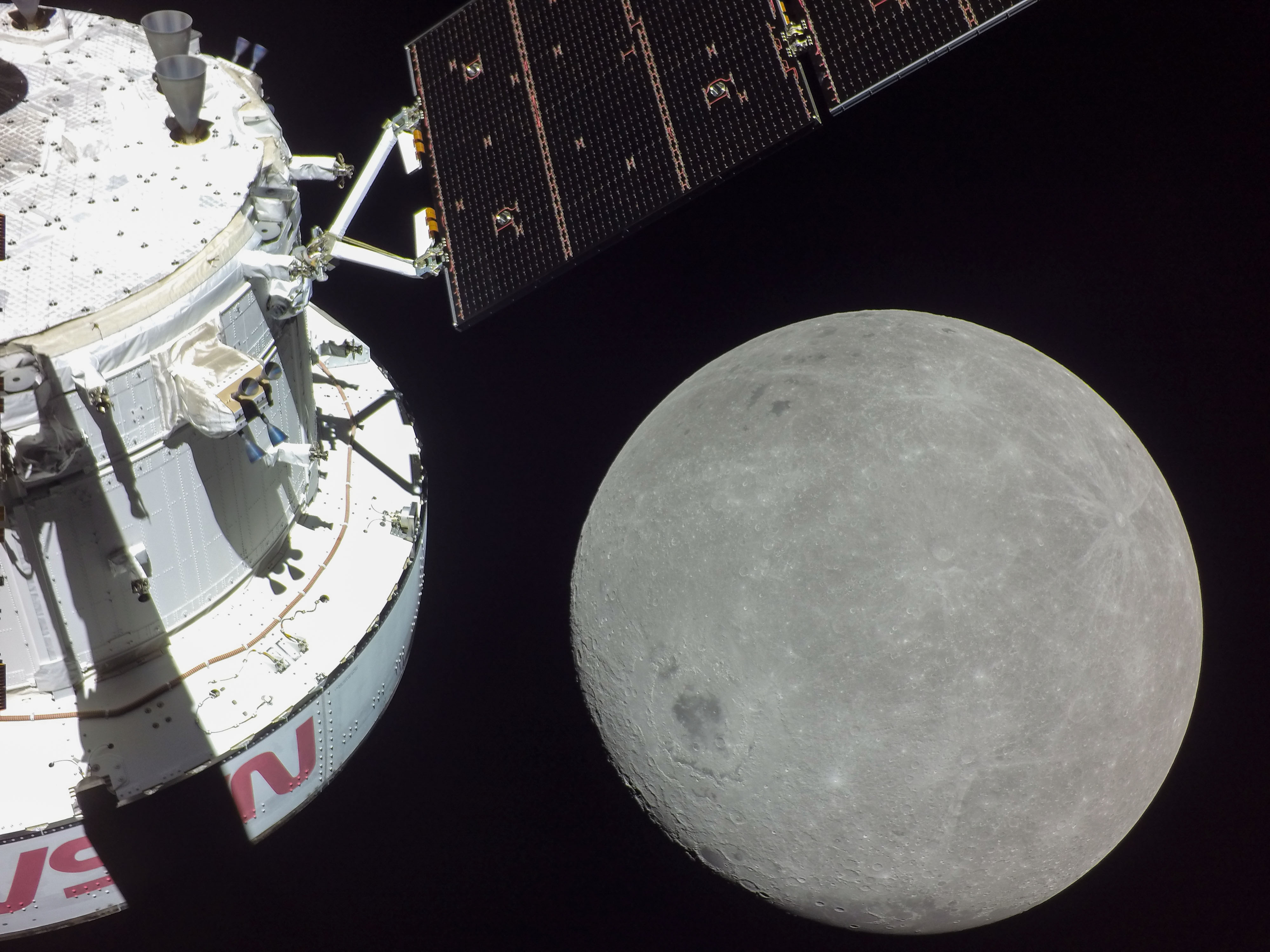
- The uncrewed Orion approaching the Moon on day six of the mission
- Names: Artemis I (official); Exploration Mission-1 (EM-1)
- Mission type: Uncrewed lunar orbital flight test
- Operator: NASA
- COSPAR ID: 2022-156A
- SATCAT no.: 54257
- Website: nasa.gov/mission/artemis-i
- Mission duration: 25 days, 10 hours, 52 minutes and 46 seconds
- Distance travelled: 1.3 million miles (2.1 million kilometers)

Spacecraft properties
- Spacecraft: Orion CM-002; ESM-1
- Manufacturer: Orion: Lockheed Martin; ESM: Airbus

Start of mission
- Launch date: November 16, 2022, 06:47:44 UTC (1:47:44 am EST)
- Rocket: Space Launch System
- Launch site: Kennedy, LC-39B

End of mission
- Recovered by: USS Portland
- Landing date: December 11, 2022, 17:40:30 UTC (9:40:30 am PST)
- Landing site: Pacific Ocean off Baja California

Orbital parameters
- Reference system: Selenocentric
- Regime: Distant retrograde orbit
- Period: 14 days

Flyby of Moon
- Closest approach: November 21, 2022, 12:57 UTC
- Distance: 130 km (81 mi)

Moon orbiter
- Orbital insertion: November 25, 2022, 21:52 UTC
- Orbital departure: December 1, 2022, 21:53 UTC

Flyby of Moon
- Spacecraft component: Orion
- Closest approach: December 5, 2022, 16:43 UTC
- Distance: 128 km (80 mi)
- Mission insignia Artemis program Orion program

Artemis I (November 16 – December 11, 2022), formerly Exploration Mission-1 (EM-1), was an uncrewed Moon-orbiting mission. As the first major spaceflight of NASA's Artemis program, Artemis I marked the agency's return to lunar exploration after the conclusion of the Apollo program nearly five decades earlier. It was the first integrated flight test of the Orion spacecraft and Space Launch System (SLS) rocket, (Note: An Orion capsule was flown in 2014, but not the entire Orion spacecraft.) and its main objective was to test the Orion spacecraft, especially its heat shield, in preparation for subsequent Artemis missions. These missions seek to reestablish a human presence on the Moon and demonstrate technologies and business approaches needed for future scientific studies, including exploration of Mars.

The Orion spacecraft for Artemis I was stacked on October 20, 2021, and on August 17, 2022, the fully stacked vehicle was rolled out for launch after a series of delays caused by difficulties in pre-flight testing. The first two launch attempts were canceled due to a faulty engine temperature reading on August 29, 2022, and a hydrogen leak during fueling on September 3, 2022. Artemis I was launched on November 16, 2022, at 1:47:44 am EST.

Artemis I was launched from Launch Complex 39B at the Kennedy Space Center. After reaching Earth orbit, the upper stage carrying the Orion spacecraft separated and performed a trans-lunar injection before releasing Orion and deploying ten CubeSat satellites. Orion completed one flyby of the Moon on November 21, entered a distant retrograde orbit for six days, and completed a second flyby of the Moon on December 5.

The Orion spacecraft then returned and reentered the Earth's atmosphere with the protection of its heat shield, splashing down in the Pacific Ocean on December 11. The mission aimed to certify Orion and the Space Launch System for crewed flights beginning with Artemis II, a crewed lunar flyby in April 2026.

== Mission profile ==
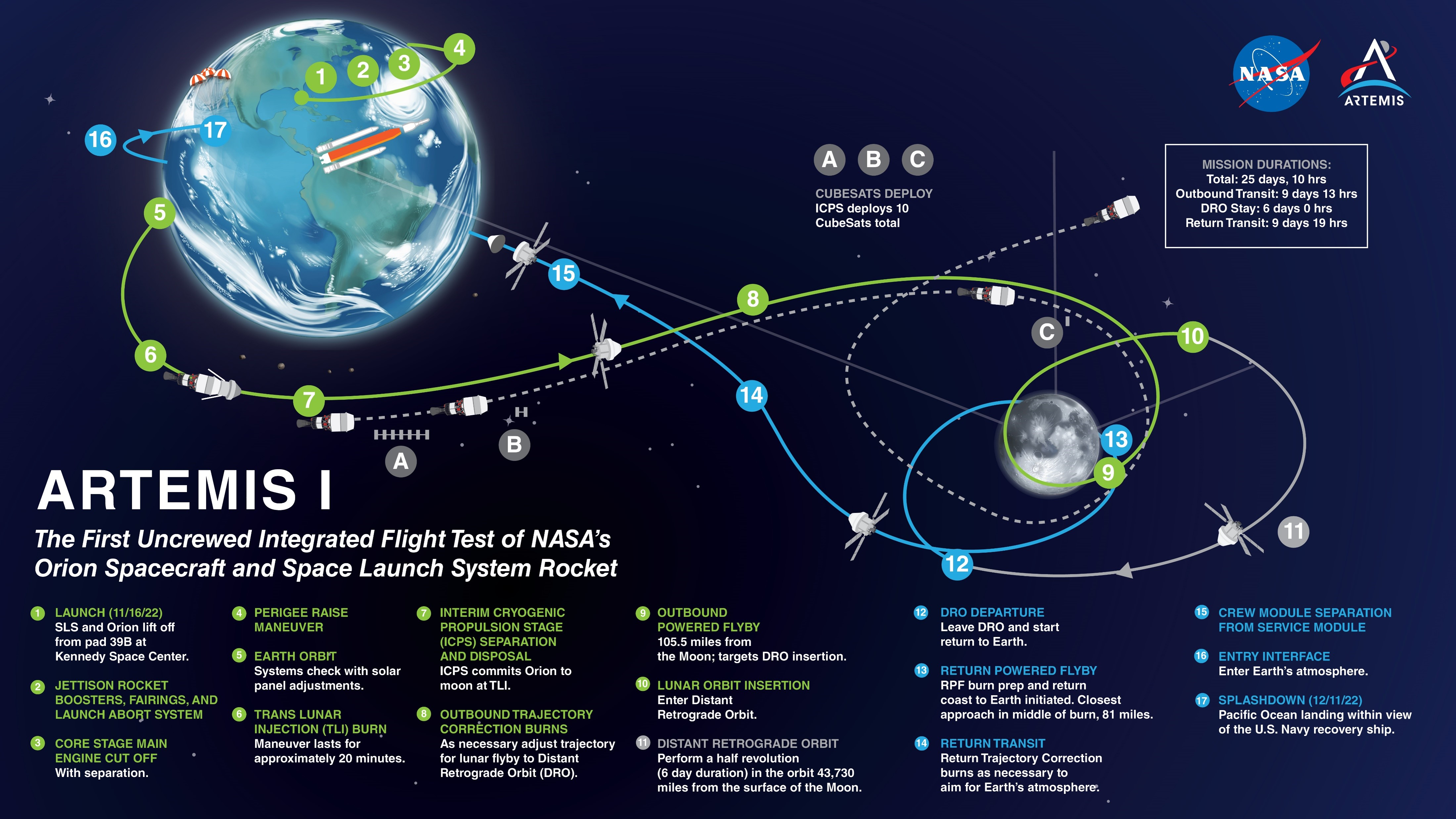
Diagram showing the objectives of the Artemis I mission

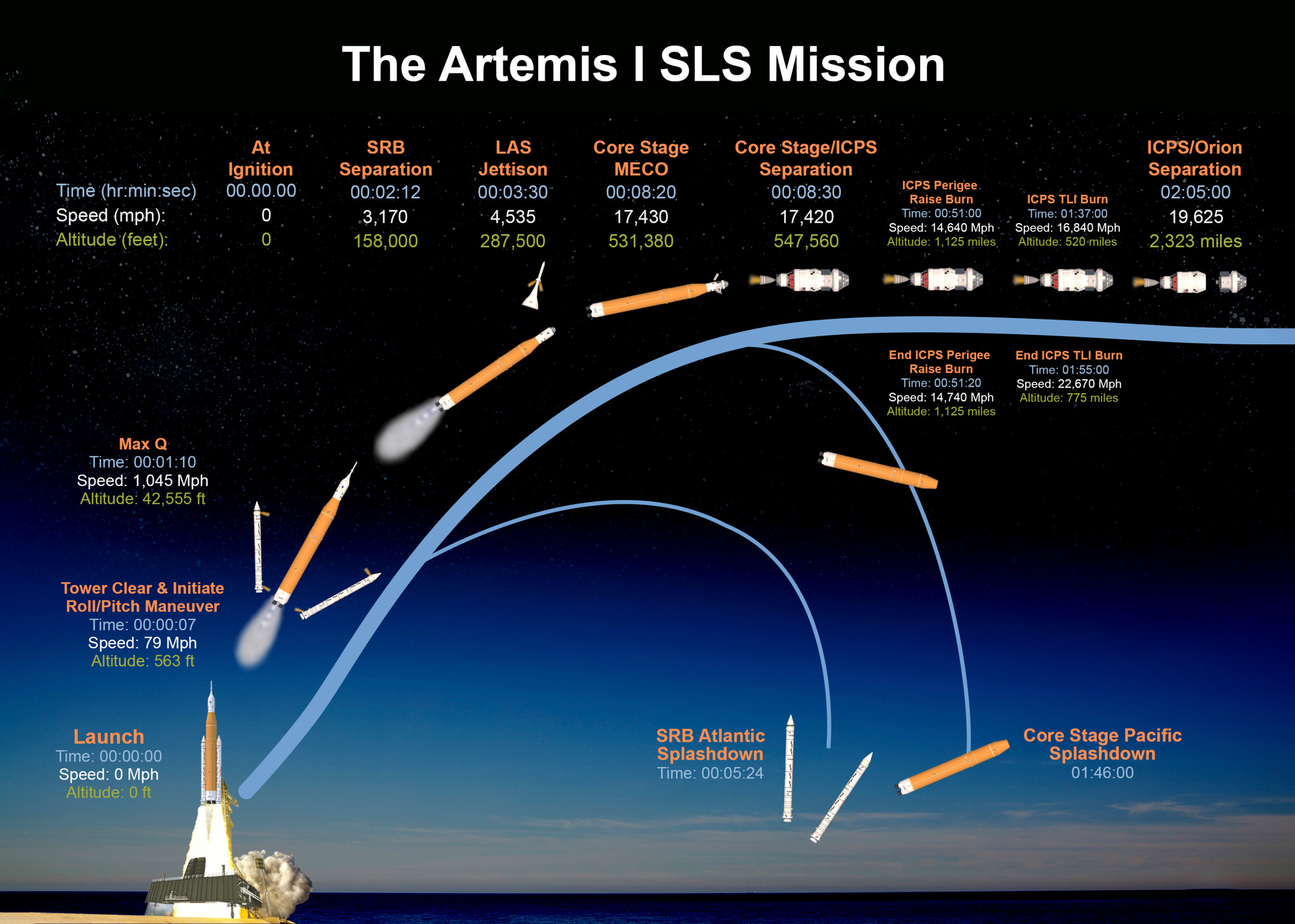
Key events from launch and ascent to space

Artemis I was launched on the Block 1 variant of the Space Launch System. The Block 1 vehicle consisted of a core stage, two five-segment solid rocket boosters (SRBs) and an upper stage. The core stage used four RS-25D engines, all of which had previously flown on Space Shuttle missions. The core and boosters together produced 39,000 kN (8,800,000 lb_{f}), or about 4,000 metric tons of thrust at liftoff. The upper stage, known as the Interim Cryogenic Propulsion Stage (ICPS), was based on the Delta Cryogenic Second Stage and was powered by a single RL10B-2 engine on the Artemis I mission.

Once in orbit, the ICPS fired its engine to perform a trans-lunar injection (TLI) burn, which placed the Orion spacecraft and 10 CubeSats on a trajectory to the Moon. Orion then separated from the ICPS and continued its coast into lunar space. Following Orion separation, the ICPS Stage Adapter deployed ten CubeSats for conducting scientific research and performing technology demonstrations.

The Orion spacecraft spent approximately three weeks in space, including six days in a distant retrograde orbit (DRO) around the Moon. It came within approximately 130 km (80 mi) of the lunar surface (closest approach) and achieved a maximum distance from Earth of 432,210 km (268,563 mi).

Mission timeline
Date/Time (UTC)	Event
Launch
November 16, 06:47:44	Liftoff
November 16, 06:49:56	Solid rocket booster separation
November 16, 06:50:55	Service module fairing jettisoned
November 16, 06:51:00	Launch abort system (LAS) jettisoned
November 16, 06:55:47	Core stage main engine cutoff (MECO)
November 16, 06:55:59	Core stage and ICPS separation
November 16, 07:05:53 – 07:17:53	Orion solar array deployment
November 16, 07:40:40 – 07:41:02	Perigee raise maneuver
November 16, 08:17:11 – 08:35:11	ICPS trans-lunar injection (TLI) burn
November 16, 08:45:20	Orion/ICPS separation
November 16, 08:46:42	Upper-stage separation burn
November 16, 10:09:20	ICPS disposal burn
Moon outbound transit
November 16, 14:35:15	First trajectory correction burn
November 17‍–‍20	Outbound coasting phase
November 21, 12:44	Outbound powered flyby burn
November 21‍–‍24	Transit to Moon
Orbiting Moon
November 25–30	Distant retrograde orbit (DRO)
December 1, 21:53	DRO departure burn
December 1‍–‍4	Exiting DRO
Earth return
December 5‍–‍11	Return transit
December 5, 16:43	Close lunar approach
December 11, 17:40:30	Splashdown in Pacific Ocean

Mission profile animation of Artemis I

Earth-centered inertial reference frame

Earth-centered frame rotating with Moon

Earth · Artemis I · Moon

== Background ==
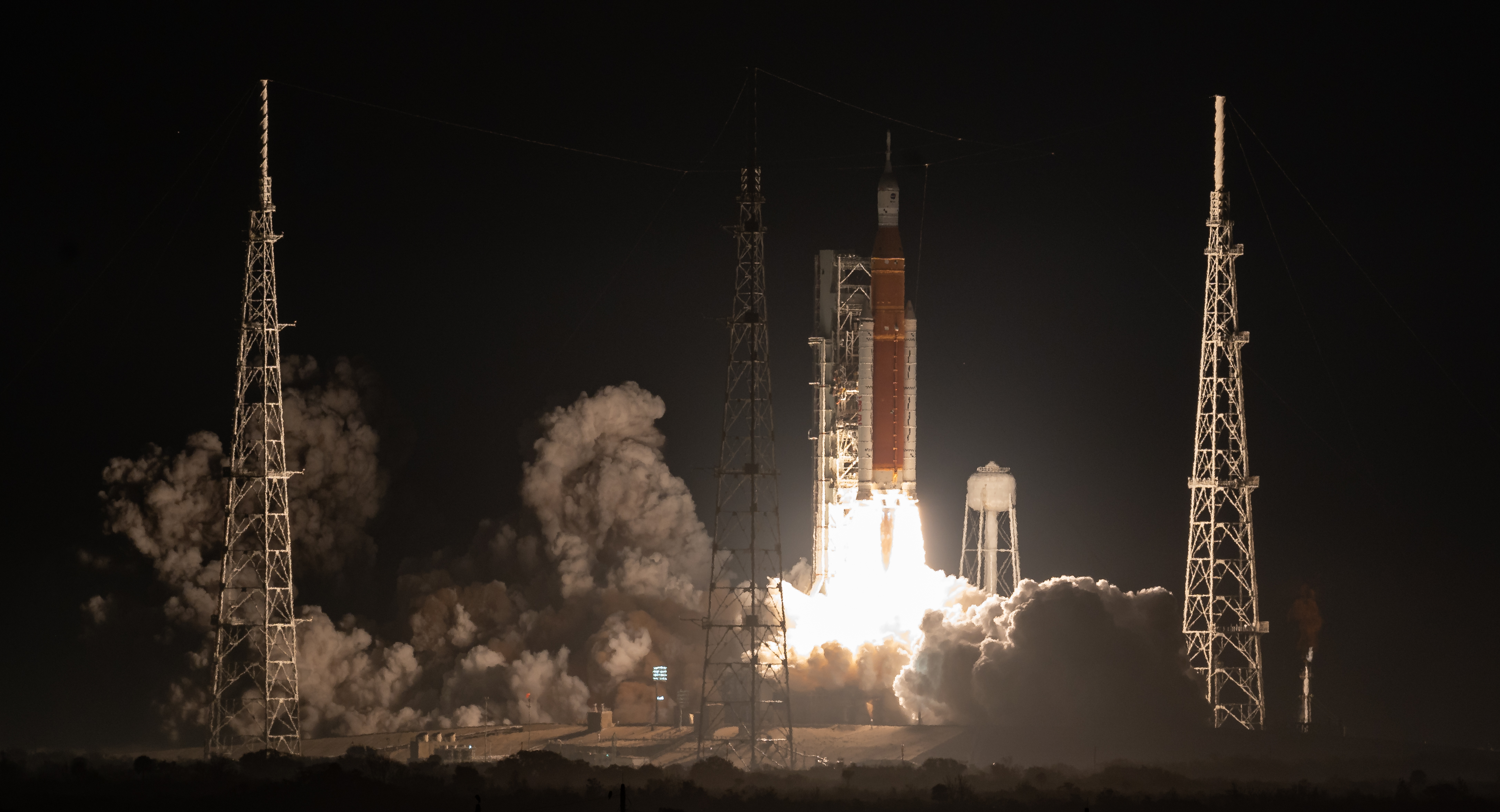
Artemis I lifts off from Launch Complex 39B at NASA's Kennedy Space Center in Florida on November 16, 2022

Artemis I was outlined by NASA as Exploration Mission 1 (EM-1) in 2012, at which point it was set to launch in 2017 (Note: The Space Launch System was originally mandated by Congress in the NASA Authorization Act of 2010 to be ready for flight before the end of 2016.) as the first planned flight of the SLS and the second uncrewed test flight of the Orion Multi-Purpose Crew Vehicle. The initial plans for EM-1 called for a circumlunar trajectory during a seven-day mission.

In January 2013, it was announced that the Orion spacecraft's service module was to be built by the European Space Agency and named the European Service Module. In mid-November 2014, construction of the SLS core stage began at NASA's Michoud Assembly Facility (MAF). In January 2015, NASA and Lockheed Martin announced that the primary structure in the Orion spacecraft used on Artemis I would be up to 25% lighter compared to the previous one (EFT-1). This would be achieved by reducing the number of cone panels from six (EFT-1) to three (EM-1), reducing the total number of welds from 19 to 7 and saving the additional mass of the weld material. Other savings would be due to revising its various components and wiring. For Artemis I, the Orion spacecraft was to be outfitted with a complete life support system and crew seats but would be left uncrewed.

In February 2017, NASA began investigating the feasibility of a crewed launch as the first SLS flight. It would have had a crew of two astronauts and the flight time would have been shorter than the uncrewed version. However, after a months-long feasibility study, NASA rejected the proposal, citing cost as the primary issue, and continued with the plan to fly the first SLS mission uncrewed.

In March 2019, then-NASA administrator Jim Bridenstine proposed moving the Orion spacecraft from SLS to commercial rockets, either the Falcon Heavy or Delta IV Heavy, to comply with the schedule. The mission would require two launches: one to place the Orion spacecraft into orbit around the Earth, and a second carrying an upper stage. The two would then dock while in Earth orbit, and the upper stage would ignite to send Orion to the Moon. The idea was eventually scrapped. One challenge with this option would be carrying out that docking, as Orion is not planned to carry a docking mechanism until Artemis III. The concept was shelved in mid-2019, due to another study's conclusion that it would further delay the mission.

=== Ground testing ===
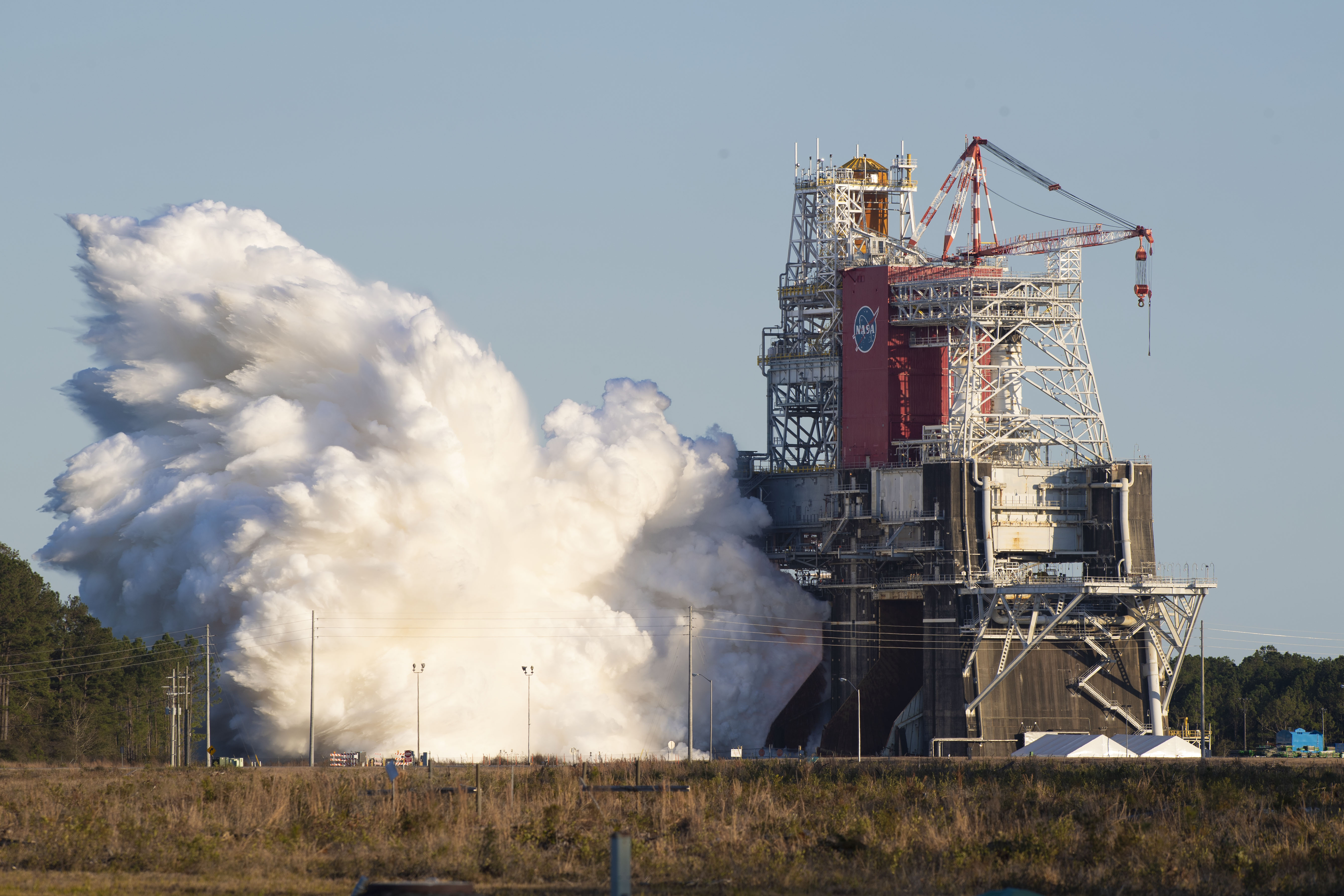
First static-fire attempt of the core stage performed on January 16, 2021

The core stage for Artemis I, built at Michoud Assembly Facility in Louisiana by Boeing, had all four engines attached in November 2019 and was declared finished one month later. The core stage left the facility to undergo the Green Run test series at Stennis Space Center, consisting of eight tests of increasing complexity:

1. Modal testing (vibration tests)
2. Avionics (electronic systems)
3. Fail-safe systems
4. Propulsion (without firing of the engines)
5. Thrust vector control system (moving and rotating engines)
6. Launch countdown simulation
7. Wet dress rehearsal, with propellant
8. Static fire of the engines for eight minutes

The first test was performed in January 2020, and subsequent Green Run tests proceeded without issue. On January 16, 2021, a year later, the eighth and final test was performed, but the engines shut down after running for one minute. This was caused by pressure in the hydraulic system used for the engines' thrust vector control system dropping below the limits set for the test. However, the limits were conservative – if such an anomaly occurred in launch, the rocket would still fly normally. The static fire test was performed again on March 18, 2021, this time achieving a full-duration eight-minute burn. The core subsequently departed the Stennis Space Center on April 24, 2021, en route to the Kennedy Space Center.

=== Assembly ===
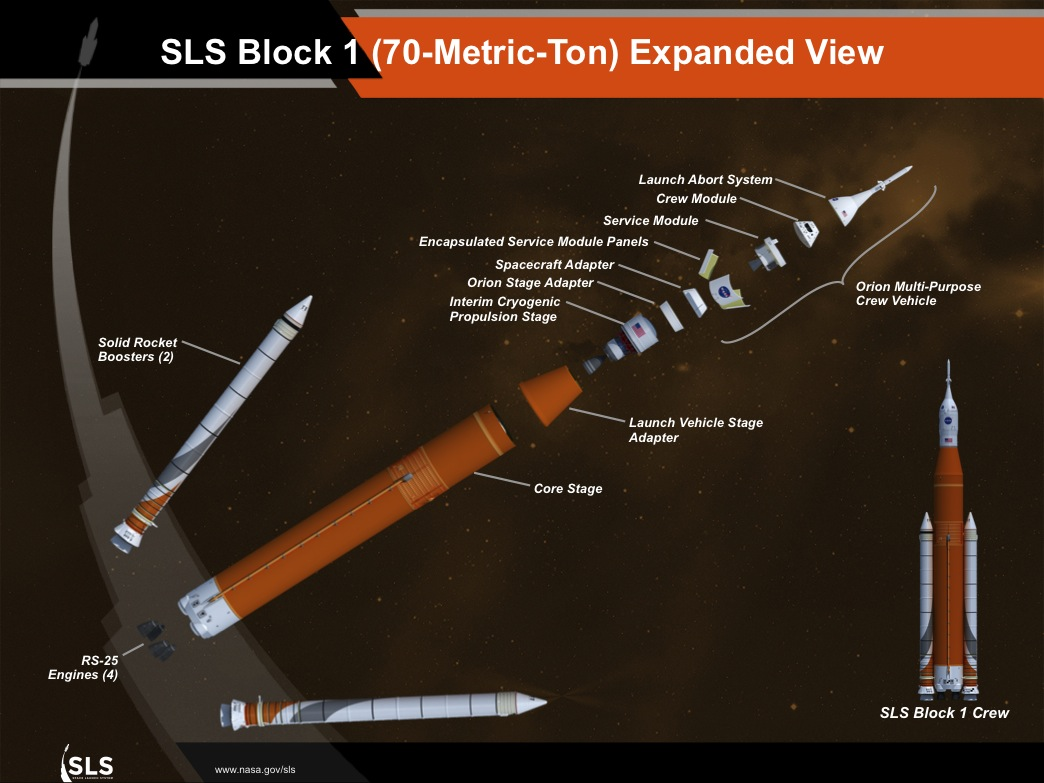
Block 1 variant of SLS rocket

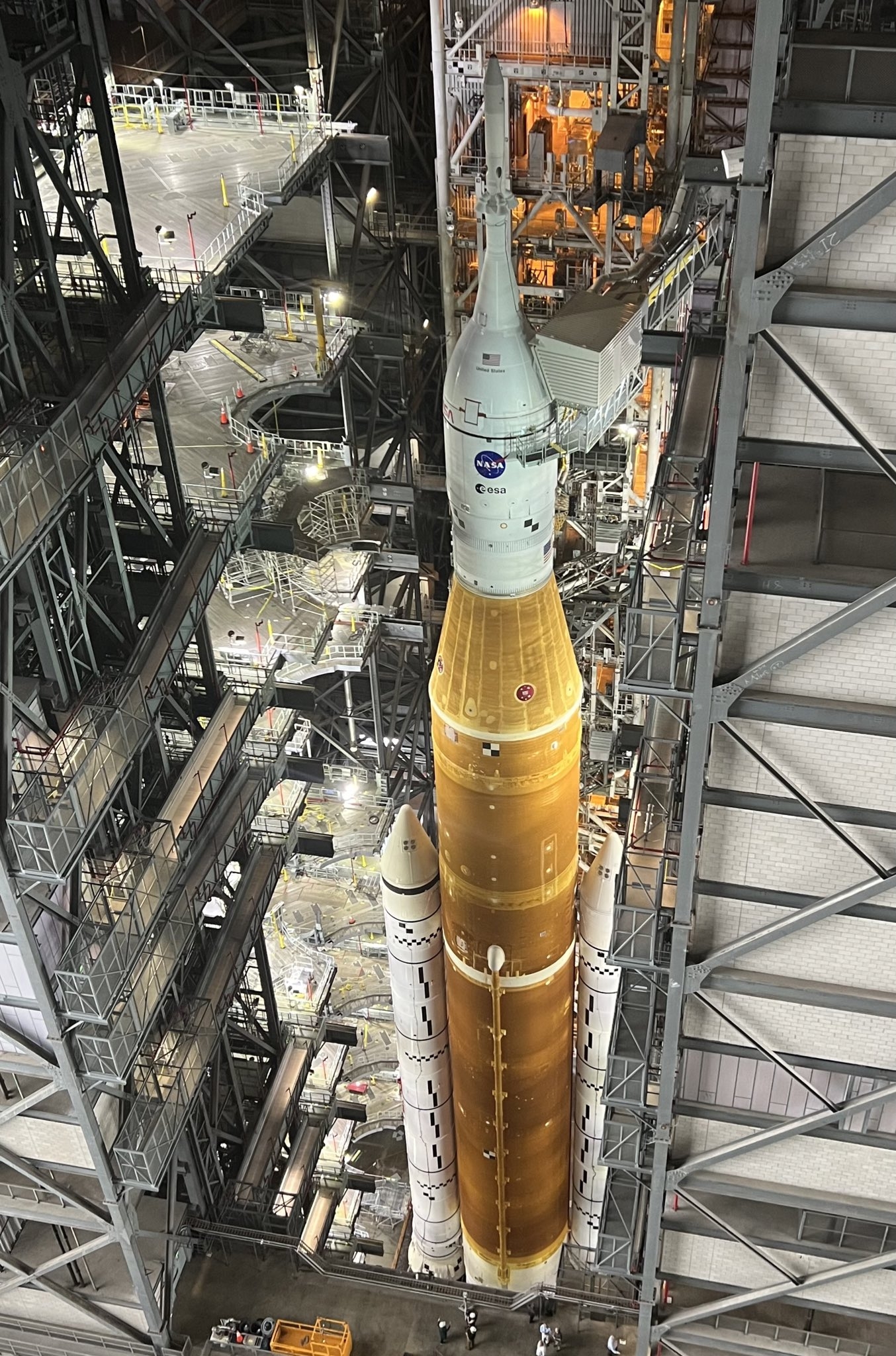
SLS with the Orion capsule stacked in the Vehicle Assembly Building, March 2022

SLS/Orion is assembled by stacking its major sub-assemblies atop a mobile launcher platform inside the NASA Vehicle Assembly Building (VAB). First, the seven components of each of the two boosters are stacked. The core stage is then stacked and is supported by the boosters. The interstage and upper stage are stacked atop the core, and the Orion spacecraft is then stacked onto the upper stage.

The Interim Cryogenic Propulsion Stage was the first part of the SLS to be delivered to the Kennedy Space Center in July 2017. Three years later, all of the SLS's solid rocket booster segments were shipped by train to the Kennedy Space Center on June 12, 2020, and the SLS launch vehicle stage adapter (LVSA) was delivered by barge one month later on July 29. The assembly of the SLS took place at the Vehicle Assembly Building's High Bay 3, beginning with the placement of the two bottom solid rocket booster segments onto Mobile Launcher-1 on November 23. Assembly of the boosters was temporarily paused due to the core stage Green Run test delays before being resumed on January 7, 2021, and the boosters' stacking was completed by March 2.

The SLS core stage for the mission, CS-1, arrived at the launch site on the Pegasus barge on April 27, 2021, after the successful conclusion of Green Run tests. It was moved to the VAB low bay for refurbishment and stacking preparations on April 29. The stage was then stacked with its boosters on June 12. The stage adapter was stacked on the Core Stage on June 22. The ICPS upper stage was stacked on July 6. Following the completion of umbilical retract testing and integrated modal testing, the Orion stage adapter with ten secondary payloads was stacked atop the upper stage on October 8. This marked the first time a super-heavy-lift vehicle has been stacked inside NASA's VAB since the final Saturn V in 1973.

The Artemis I Orion spacecraft began fueling and pre-launch servicing in the Multi-Payload Processing Facility on January 16, 2021, following a handover to NASA Exploration Ground Systems (EGS). On October 20, the Orion spacecraft, encapsulated under the launch abort system and aerodynamic cover, was rolled over to the VAB and stacked atop the SLS rocket, finishing the stacking of the Artemis I vehicle in High Bay 3. During a period of extensive integrated testing and checkouts, one of the four RS-25 engine controllers failed, requiring a replacement and delaying the first rollout of the rocket.

=== Launch preparations ===
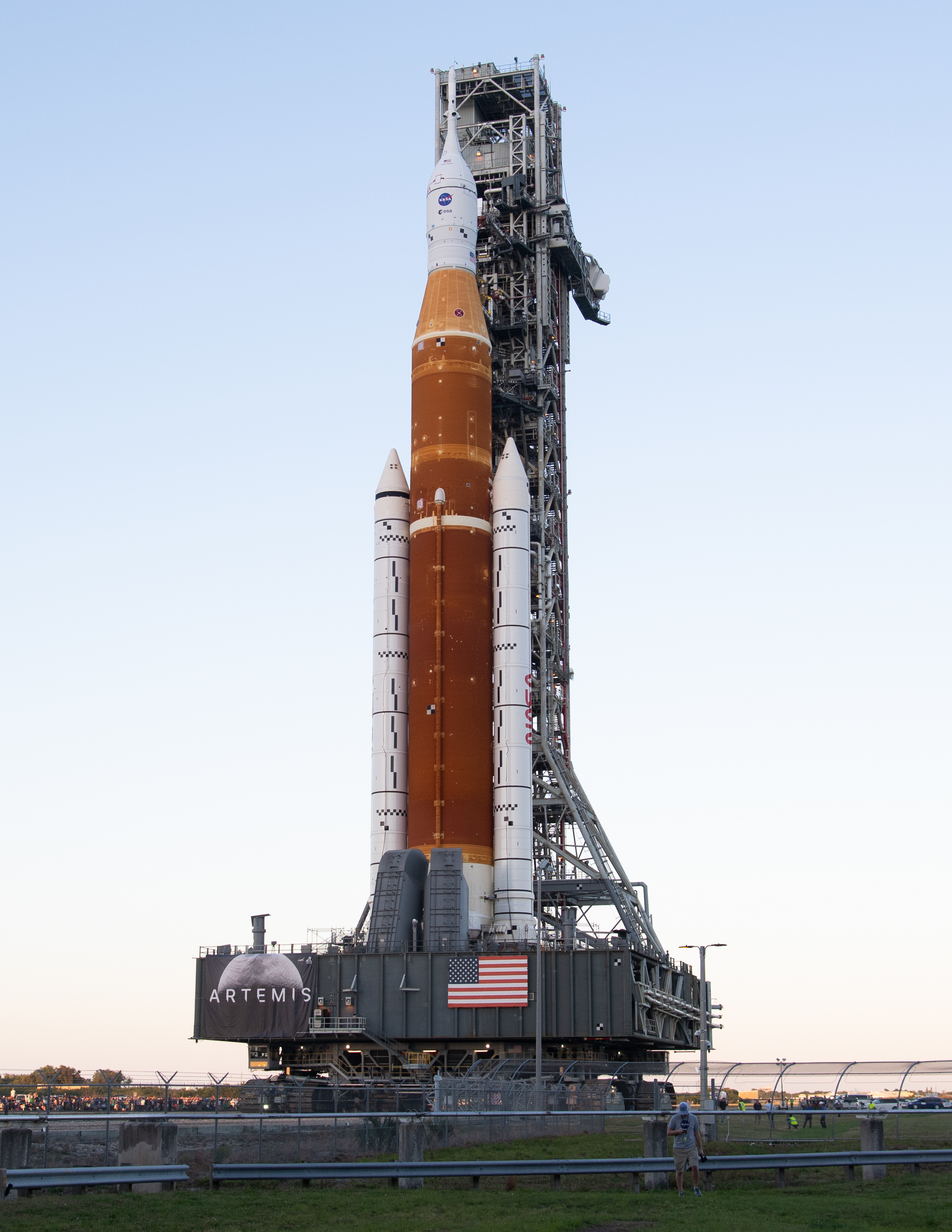
First rollout of SLS in March 2022. It was subsequently rolled back in for repairs.

On March 17, 2022, Artemis I rolled out of High Bay 3 from the VAB for the first time to perform a pre-launch wet dress rehearsal (WDR). The initial WDR attempt, on April 3, was scrubbed due to a mobile launcher pressurization problem. A second attempt to complete the test was scrubbed on April 4, after problems with supplying gaseous nitrogen to the launch complex, liquid oxygen temperatures, and a vent valve stuck in a closed position.

During preparations for a third attempt, a helium check valve on the ICPS upper stage was kept in a semi-open position by a small piece of rubber originating from one of the mobile launcher's umbilical arms, forcing test conductors to delay fueling the stage until the valve could be replaced in the VAB. The third attempt to finish the test did not include fueling the upper stage. The rocket's liquid oxygen tank started loading successfully. However, during the loading of liquid hydrogen on the core stage, a leak was discovered on the tail service mast umbilical plate, located on the mobile launcher at the base of the rocket, forcing another early end to the test.

NASA rolled the vehicle back to the VAB to repair the hydrogen leak and the ICPS helium check valve while upgrading the nitrogen supply at LC-39B after prolonged outages on the three previous wet dress rehearsals. Artemis I was rolled back to the VAB on April 26. After the repairs and upgrades were complete the Artemis I vehicle rolled out to LC-39B for a second time on June 6 to complete the test.

During the fourth wet dress rehearsal attempt on June 20, the rocket was fully loaded with propellant on both stages. Still, due to a hydrogen leak on the quick-disconnect connection of the tail service mast umbilical, the countdown could not reach the planned T−9.3 seconds mark and was stopped automatically at T−29 seconds. NASA mission managers soon determined they had completed almost all planned test objectives and declared the WDR campaign complete.

On July 2, the Artemis I stack was rolled back to the VAB for final launch preparations and to fix the hydrogen leak on the quick disconnect ahead of a launch targeted in two launch windows: August 29 and September 5. The SLS passed its flight readiness review on August 23, checking out five days before the first launch opportunity.

=== Initial launch attempts ===
Attempt	Planned	Result	Turnaround	Reason	Decision point	Weather go (%)	Notes
1	29 Aug 2022, 8:33:00 am	Scrubbed	—	Technical	29 Aug 2022, 10:33 am		High temperature in engine 3, hydrogen leak, and communication problems.
2	3 Sep 2022, 2:17:00 pm	Scrubbed	5 days 5 hours 44 minutes	Technical	3 Sep 2022, 11:17 am		Hydrogen leak in service arm.
3	16 Nov 2022, 1:47:44 am	Success	73 days 11 hours 31 minutes				

Fueling was scheduled to commence just after midnight on August 29, 2022, but was delayed an hour due to offshore storms, only beginning at 1:13 am EDT. Before the planned launch at 8:33 am, Engine 3 of the rocket's four engines was observed to be above the maximum allowable temperature limit for launch. Other technical difficulties involved an eleven-minute communications delay between the spacecraft and ground control, a fuel leak, and a crack on the insulating foam of the connection joints between the liquid hydrogen and liquid oxygen tanks. NASA scrubbed the launch after an unplanned hold and the two-hour launch window expired. An investigation revealed that a sensor not used to determine launch readiness was faulty, and displayed an erroneously high temperature for Engine 3.

Following the first attempt, a second launch attempt was scheduled for the afternoon of September 3. The launch window would have opened at 2:17 pm EDT (18:17 UTC), and lasted for two hours. The launch was scrubbed at 11:17 am EDT due to a fuel supply line leak in a service arm connecting to the engine section. The cause of the leak was uncertain. Mission operators investigated whether an overpressurization of the liquid hydrogen line of the quick-disconnect interface during the launch attempt may have damaged a seal, allowing hydrogen to escape.

Launch operators decided on the date for the next launch attempt; the earliest possible opportunity was September 19 until mission managers declared that September 27, and then September 30, would be the absolute earliest date, NASA having successfully repaired the leak. A launch in September would have required that the Eastern Range of the United States Space Force agree to an extension on certification of the rocket's flight termination system, which destroys the rocket should it move off-course and towards a populated area; this was carried out on September 22. However, unfavorable forecasts of the trajectory of then-Tropical Storm Ian led launch managers to call off the September 27 launch attempt and begin preparations for the stack's rollback to the VAB. On the morning of September 26, the decision was made to roll back later that evening.

On November 12, following another delay due to Hurricane Nicole, NASA launch managers requested launch opportunities for November 16 and 19. They initially requested an opportunity for the 14th but were prevented by then-Tropical Storm Nicole. As the storm approached, NASA decided to leave the rocket at the launch pad, citing a low probability that wind speeds would exceed the rocket's design limits. Wind speeds were expected to reach 29 mph (47 km/h), with gusts up to 46 mph (74 km/h). Nicole made landfall as a category one hurricane on November 9, with sustained wind speeds at Kennedy Space Center reaching 85 mph (137 km/h), and gusts up to 100 mph (160 km/h). After the storm cleared, NASA inspected the rocket for physical damage and conducted electronic health checks. On November 15, the mission management team gave a "go" to begin fully preparing for launch, and the main tanking procedures began at 3:30 pm EST (20:30 UTC).

== Flight ==
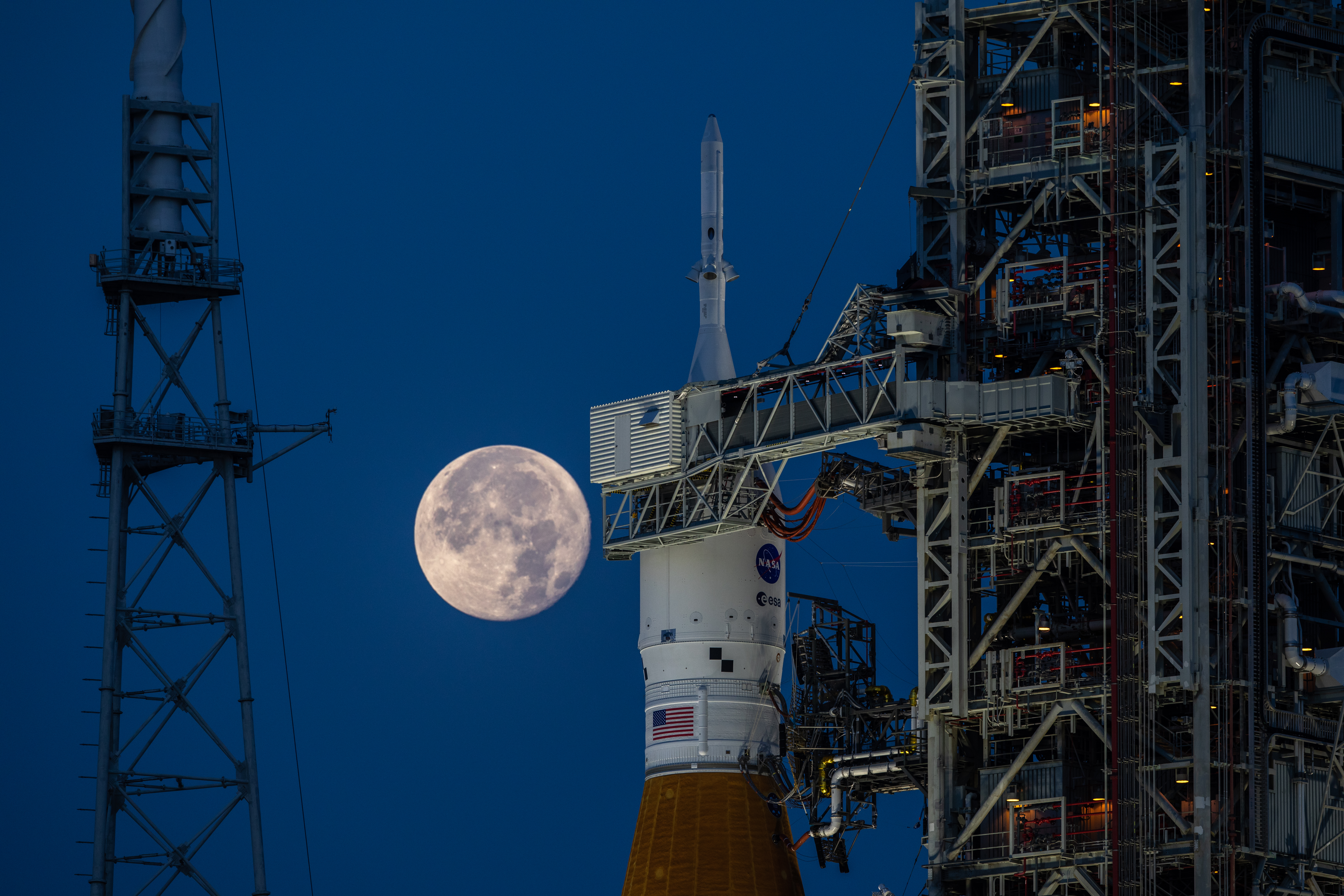
SLS on standby, ready for launch

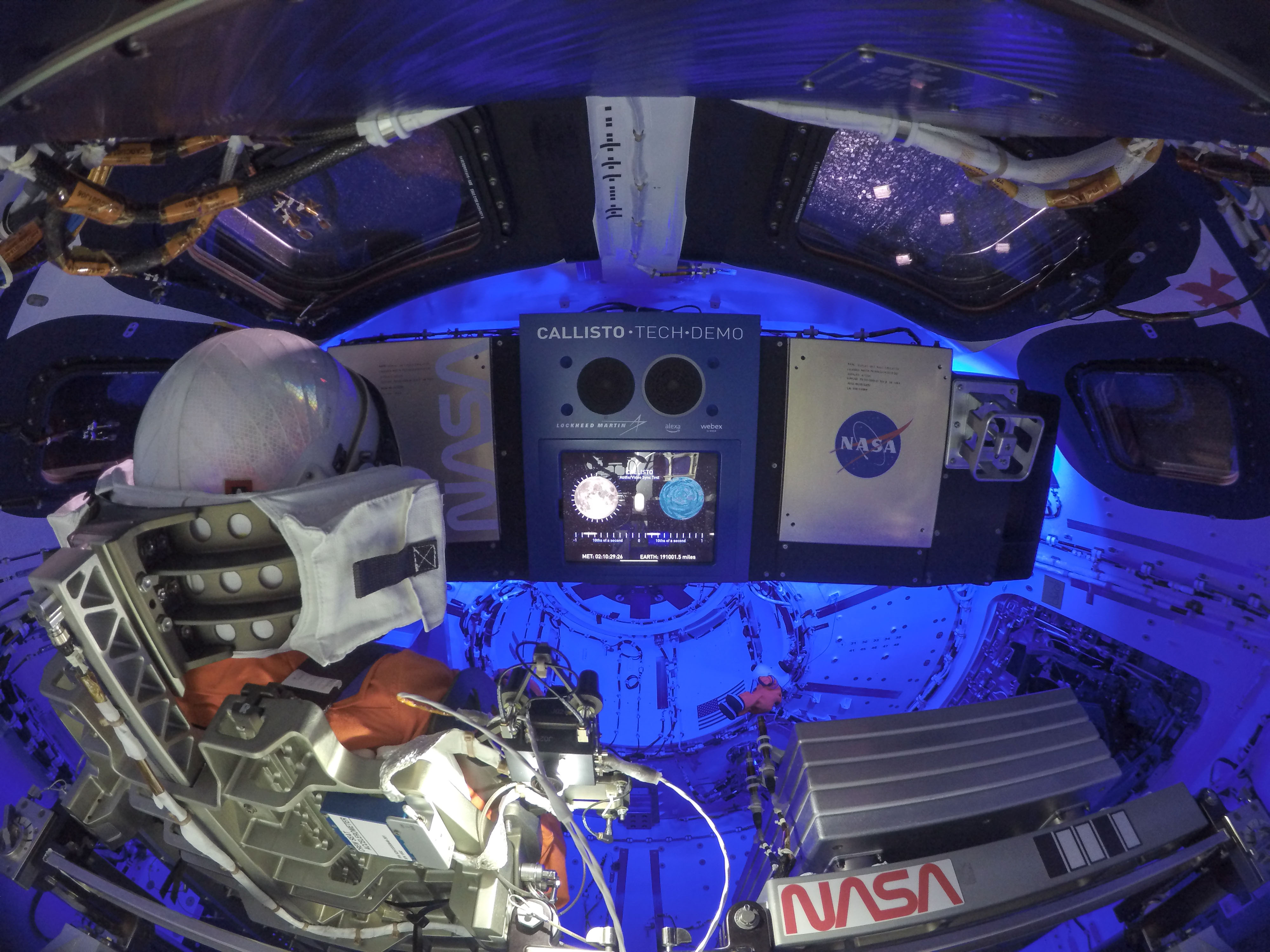
Inside Orion with mannequin Campos

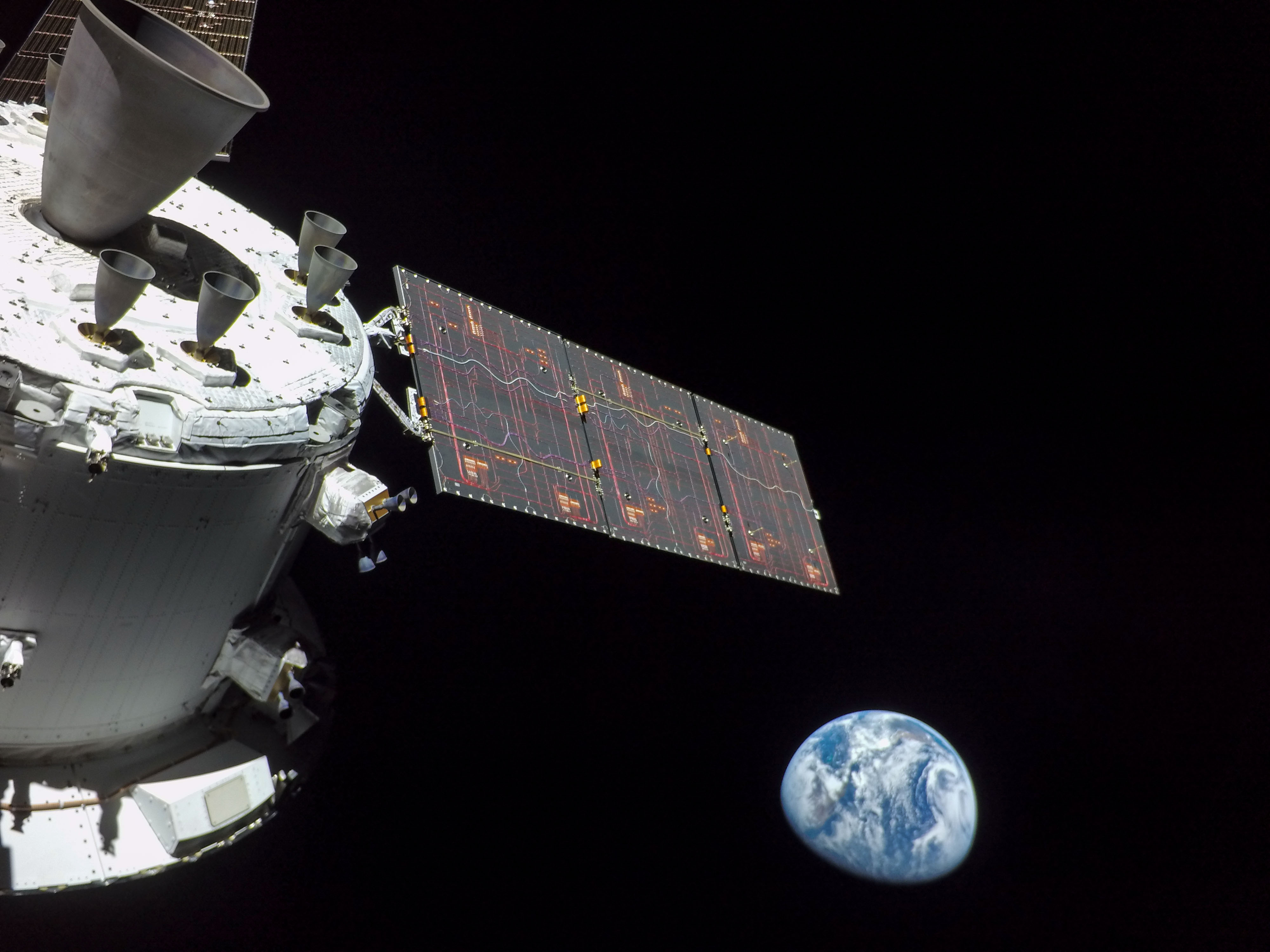
Orion on the first day of the mission

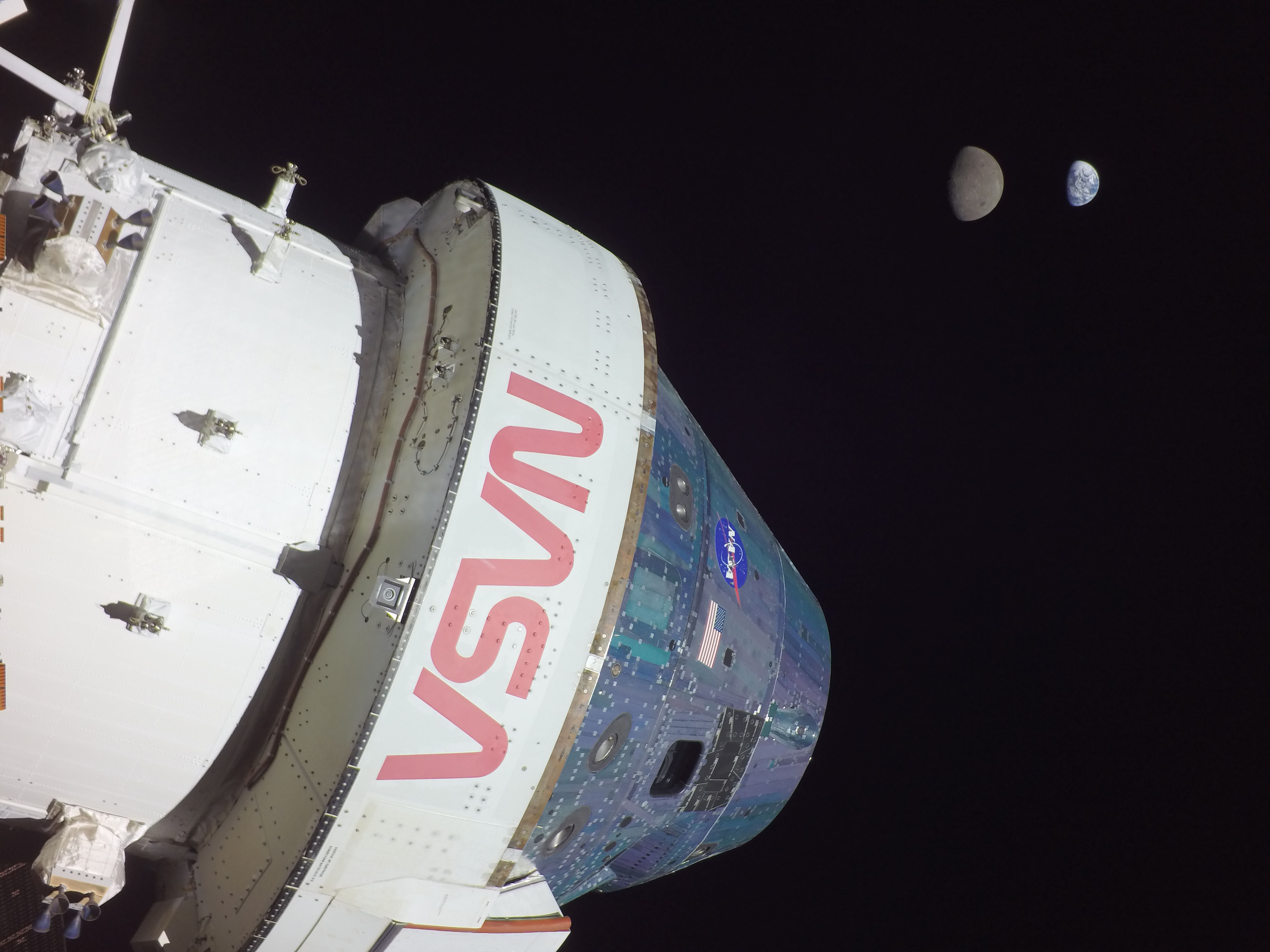
Orion, the Moon and Earth on day 13

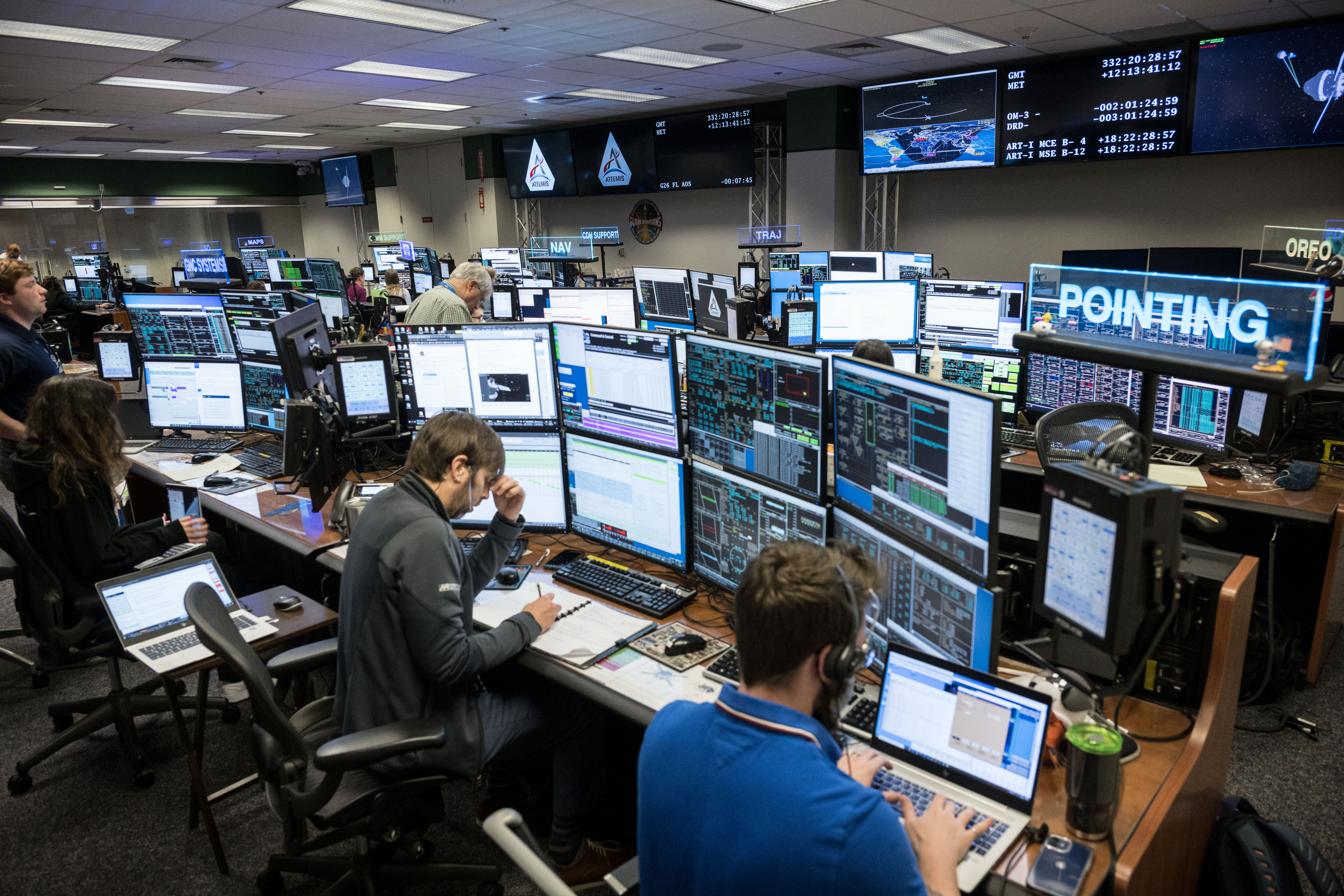
Mission control on day 14

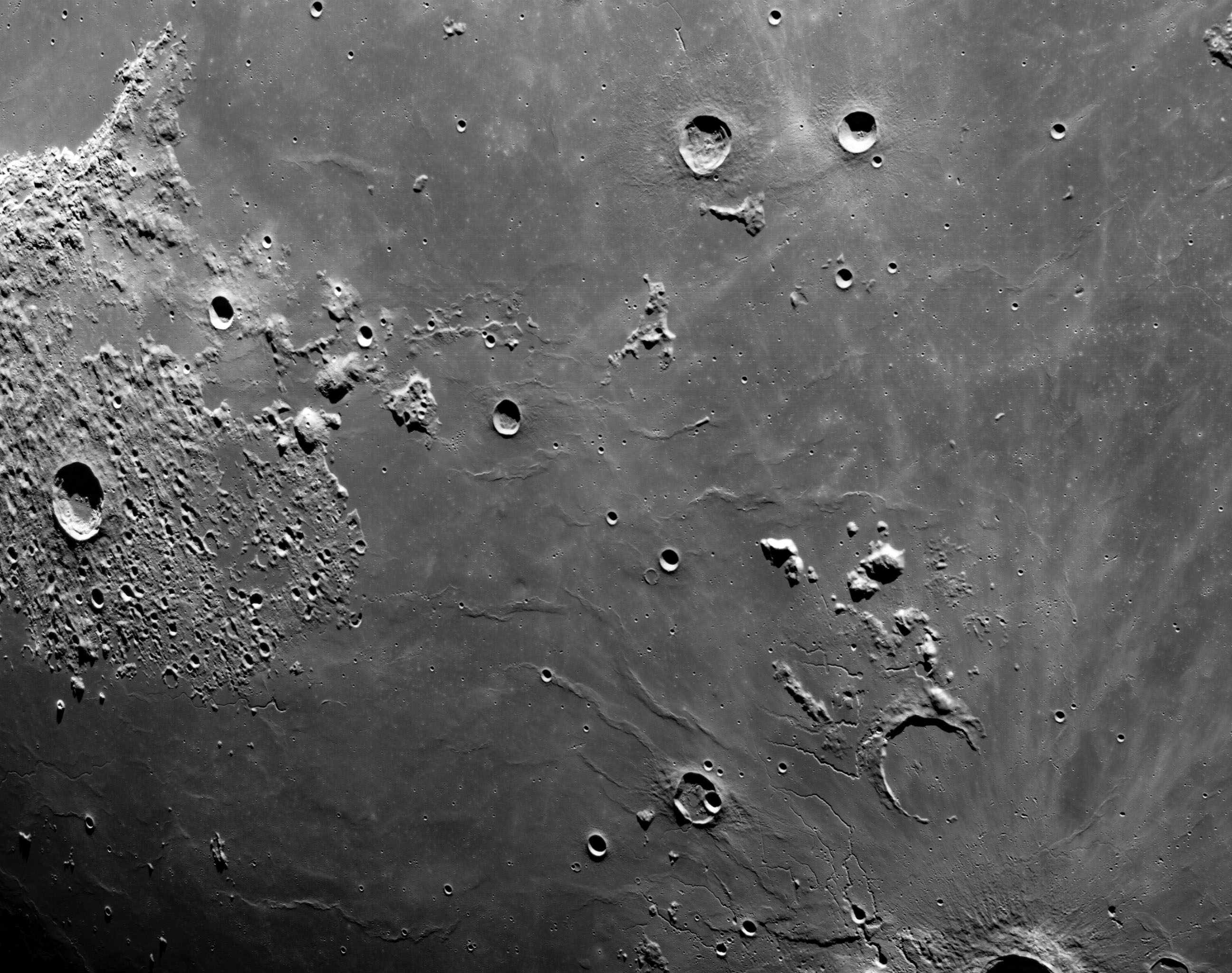
Details of the lunar surface, day 19

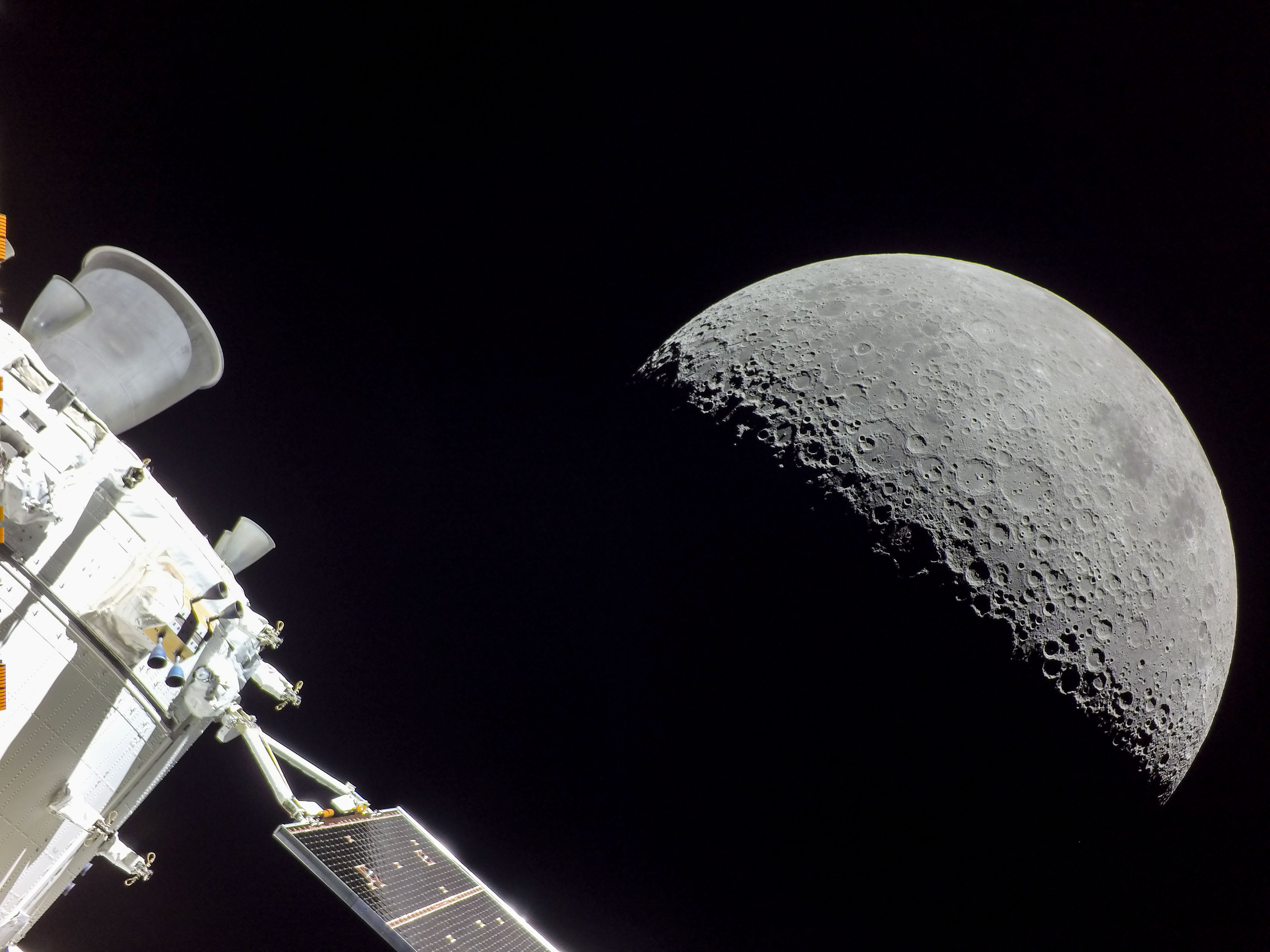
The Moon after return flyby, day 19

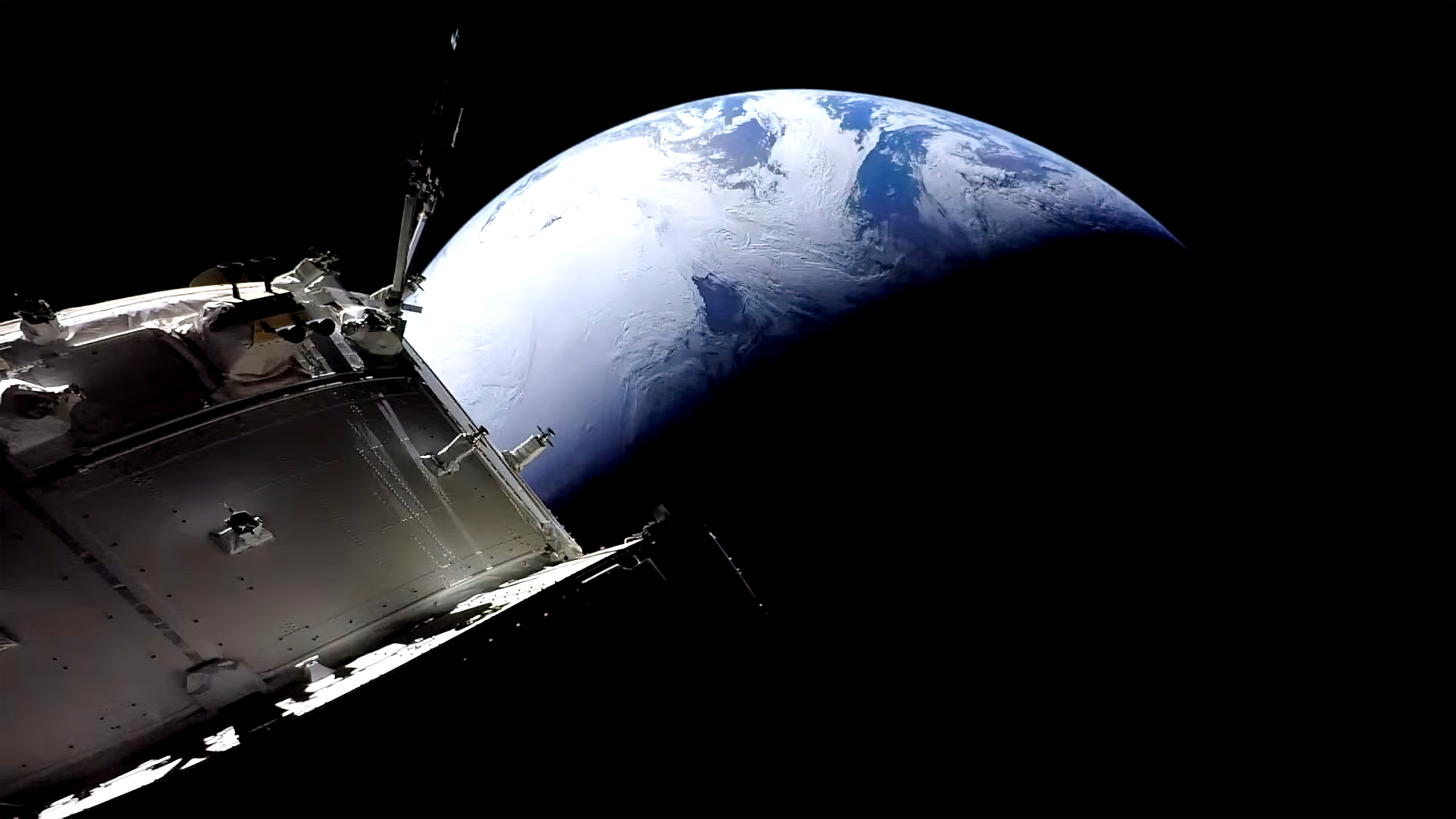
Artemis 1 before reentry, day 25

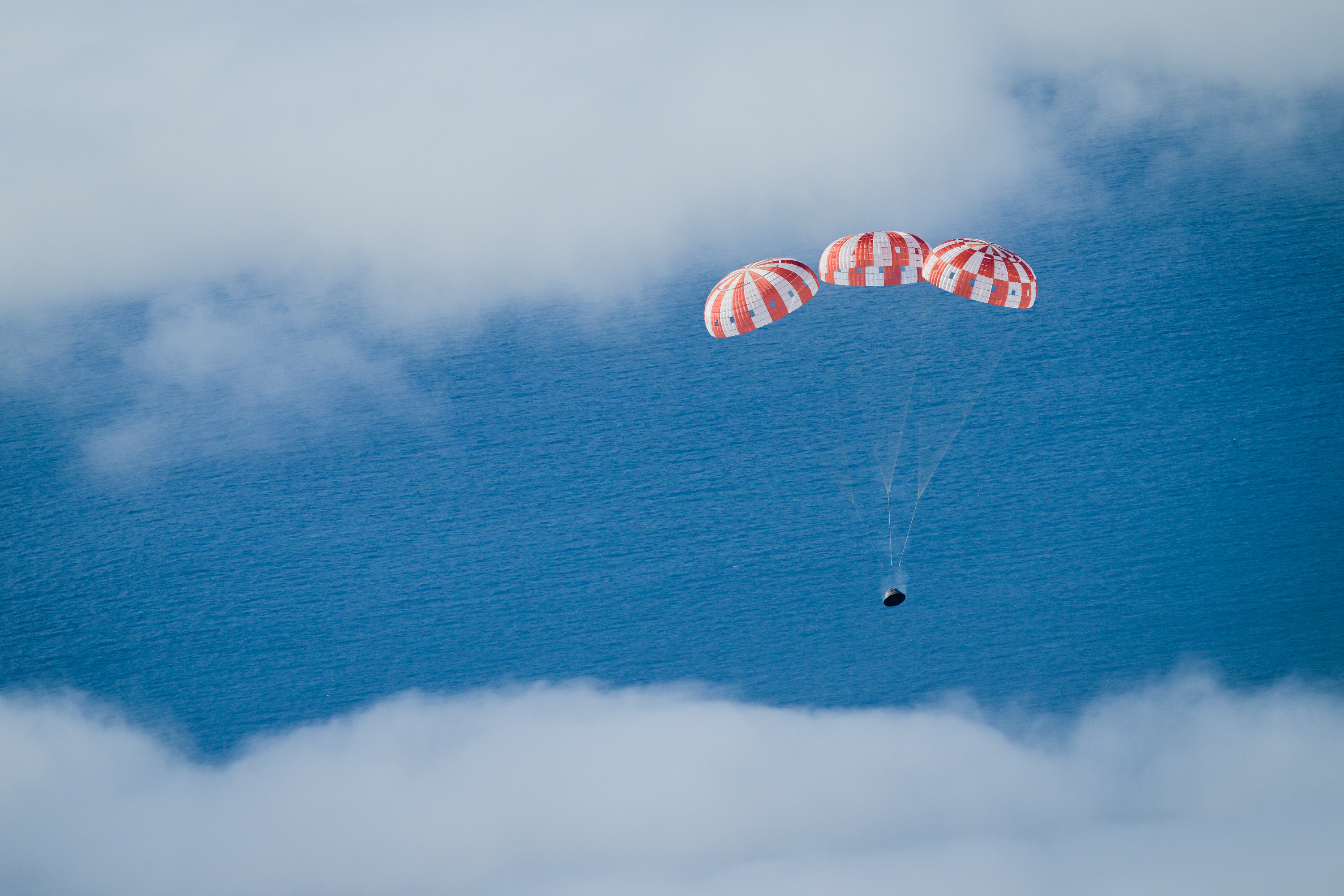
Orion descending to the Pacific Ocean

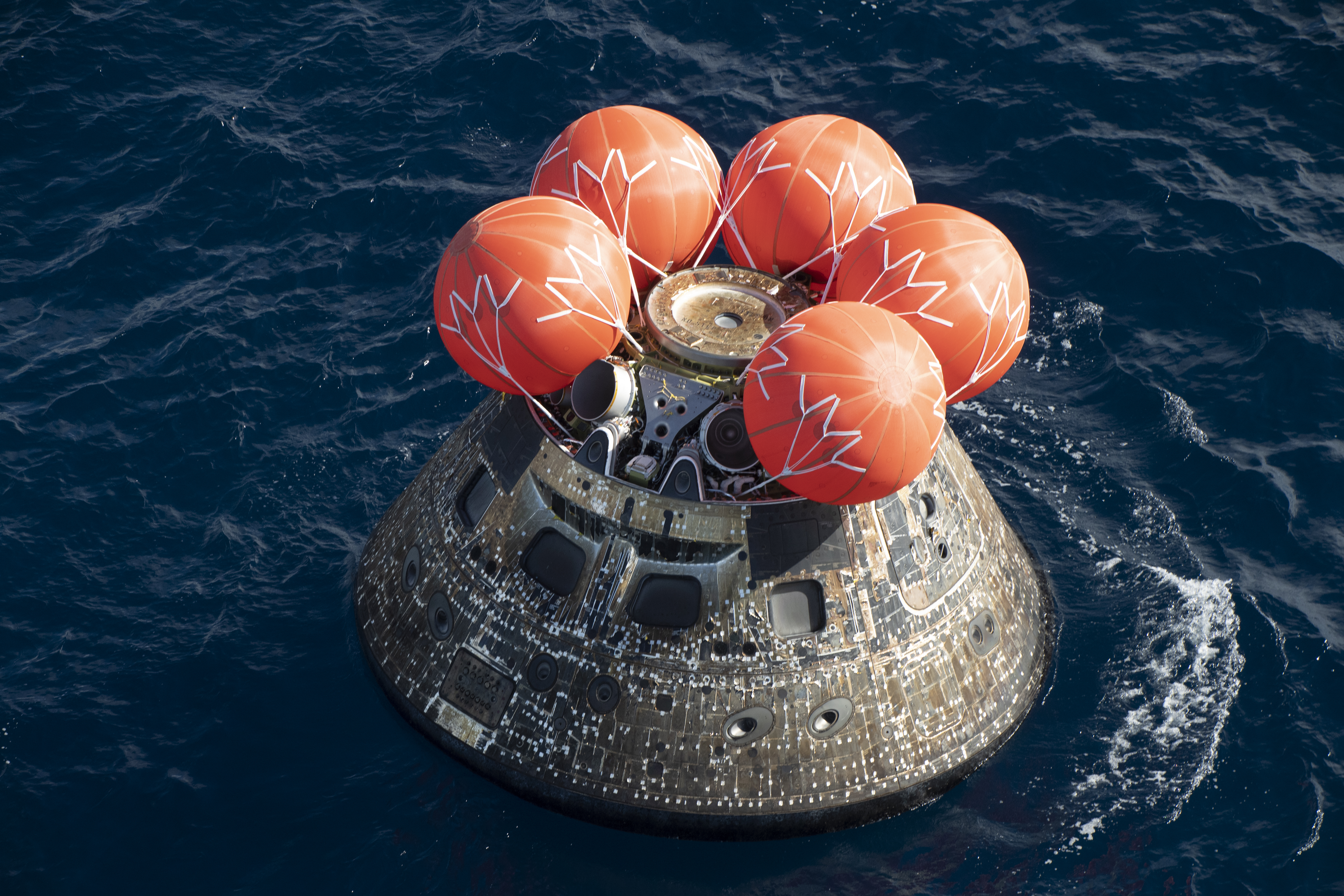
Orion shortly after splashdown

=== Launch ===
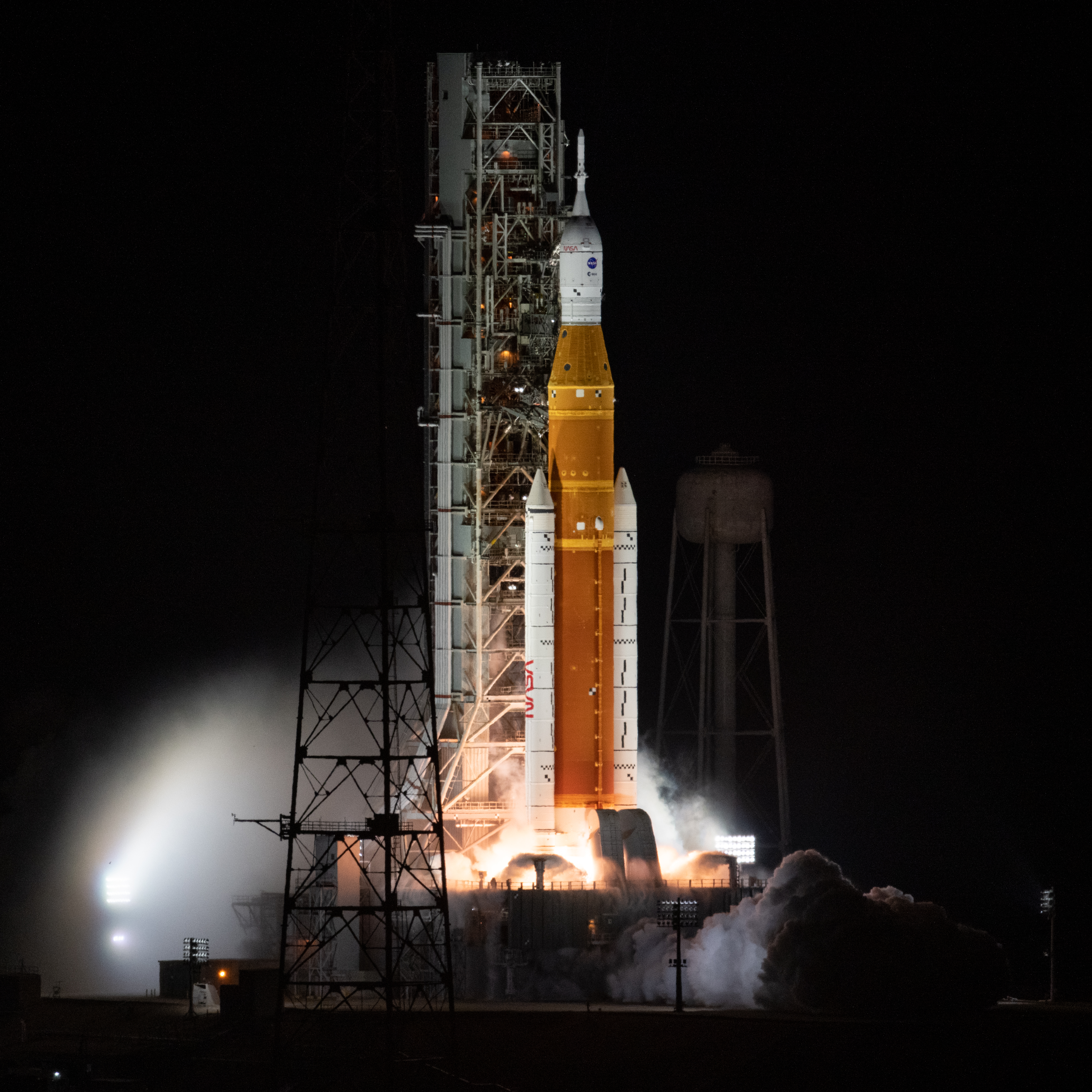
The Space Launch System launches from Kennedy Space Center's LC-39B.

Following more delays from fuel leaks, NASA made the call to send in a team of technicians. The "red team" consisted of three men, who drove to the launch site. When they arrived, they reported on the leak and set to work tightening packing nuts to correct the leak. After departing, mission control confirmed the leak had been corrected and proceeded with the count. At 6:47:44 UTC (1:47:44 am EST) on November 16, 2022, Artemis I successfully launched from Launch Complex 39B (LC-39B) at the Kennedy Space Center. Artemis I was the first launch from LC-39B since Ares I-X. The Orion spacecraft and ICPS were both placed into a nominal orbit after separating from the Space Launch System, achieving orbit approximately 8 1/2 minutes after launch.

=== Outbound flight ===
Eighty-nine minutes after liftoff, the ICPS fired for approximately eighteen minutes in a trans-lunar injection (TLI) maneuver. Orion then separated from the expended stage and fired its auxiliary thrusters to move safely away as it started its journey to the Moon. The 10 CubeSat secondary payloads were then deployed from the Orion Stage Adapter, attached to the ICPS. The ICPS conducted a final maneuver at three and a half hours after launch to dispose itself into a heliocentric orbit.

On November 20 at 19:09 UTC, the Orion spacecraft entered the lunar sphere of influence, where the influence of the Moon's gravity on the spacecraft is greater than that of Earth.

=== Lunar orbit ===
On November 21, Orion experienced a planned loss of communication with NASA from 12:25 through 12:59 UTC as it passed behind the Moon and no longer had line-of-sight to Earth. There, during an automatically controlled maneuver, the first of several trajectory-altering burns, called an "outbound powered flyby burn", to transition Orion to a distant retrograde orbit began at 12:44 UTC. The orbital maneuvering system engine fired for two minutes and thirty seconds. While operating autonomously, Orion made its closest lunar approach of approximately 130 km (81 mi) above the surface at 12:57 UTC. The spacecraft performed another burn on November 25, firing the orbital maneuvering system (OMS) for one minute and twenty-eight seconds, changing Orion's velocity by 363 ft/s (398 km/h) finally entering orbit. On November 26, at 13:42 UTC, Orion broke the record for the farthest distance from Earth traveled by an Earth-returning human-rated spacecraft. The record was formerly held by the Apollo 13 mission at 400,171 km (248,655 miles).

On November 28, Orion reached a distance of 432,210 km (268,563 mi) from Earth, the maximum distance achieved during the mission. On November 30, the Orion spacecraft performed a maintenance burn to maintain its trajectory and decrease its velocity for a planned burn on December 1, at 21:53 UTC, to depart its distant retrograde orbit around the Moon, beginning its journey back to Earth.

On December 5 at 16:43 UTC, the spacecraft reached 128 km (80 mi) from the lunar surface at its closest approach right before an earthbound burn, the "powered return flyby burn", to leave the zone of lunar gravitational influence. The spacecraft once again passed behind the Moon, losing communications with mission control for about half an hour. Shortly before the flyby, Orion experienced an electrical anomaly, which was soon resolved.

=== Return flight ===
On December 6 at 7:29 UTC, Orion exited the lunar sphere of influence. It then conducted a minor course correction burn and an inspection of the crew module's thermal protection system and the ESM. Over the next few days the mission control team continued to conduct system checks and prepared for reentry and splashdown. On December 10, mission planners announced that the final landing site would be near Guadalupe Island off the Baja peninsula in Mexico. The final trajectory correction burn of six total trajectory burns throughout the mission took place the next day five hours before reentry.

=== Reentry and splashdown ===
The spacecraft separated from its service module at around 17:00 UTC on December 11 and then reentered Earth's atmosphere at 17:20 UTC travelling near 40,000 km/h (25,000 mph). It was the first United States use of a "skip entry", a form of non-ballistic atmospheric entry into the atmosphere, pioneered by Zond 7, in which two phases of deceleration would expose human occupants to relatively less intense G-forces than would be experienced during an Apollo-style reentry. The Orion capsule splashed down at 17:40 UTC (9:40 am PST) west of Baja California near Guadalupe Island. Following splashdown, NASA personnel and the crew of USS Portland recovered the spacecraft after planned ocean testing of the capsule. The recovery team spent about two hours performing tests in open water and imaging the craft, namely to investigate signs of atmospheric re-entry, then used a winch and several tending lines to pull the craft into a securing assembly in the well dock of the USS Portland. The recovery team included personnel from the US Navy, Space Force, Kennedy Space Center, Johnson Space Center, and Lockheed Martin Space. On December 13, the Orion capsule arrived at the Port of San Diego.

=== Post-landing analysis ===
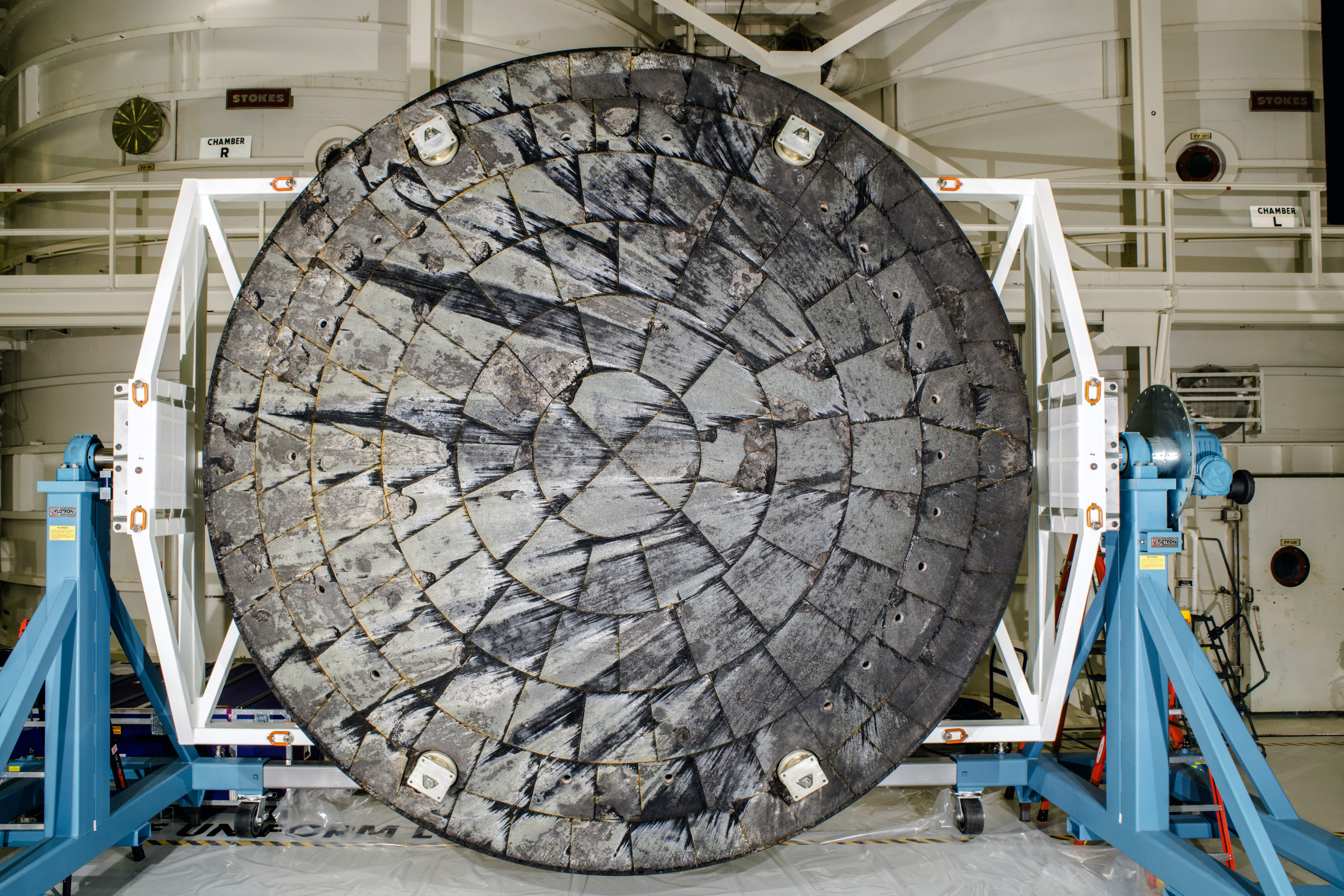
Heat shield showing damage after recovery

After the capsule was recovered, inspection showed unexpected loss of AVCOAT material used on the heat shield. NASA undertook an exhaustive and complex analysis of the loss and was finally able to report on it and announce recommendations after two years, on December 5, 2024. The conclusion was that the damage was initiated by spalling caused when gas trapped within the shield heated and expanded, blowing pieces out of the shield. This occurred during the reentry "skip" maneuver, which had a different heating and cooling profile than simpler direct-entry profiles.

== Payloads ==
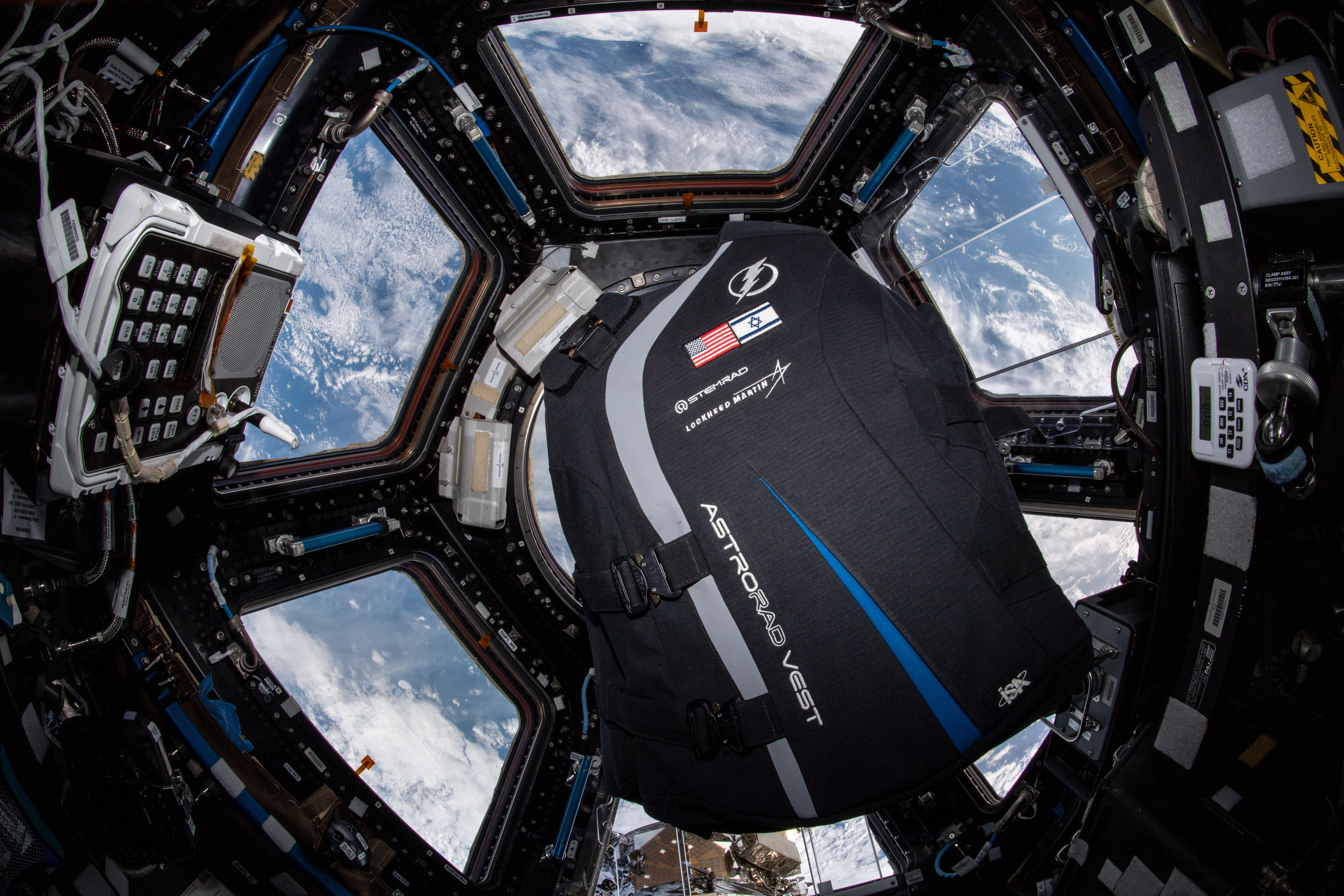
AstroRad vest on the International Space Station

The Orion spacecraft carried three astronaut-like mannequins equipped with sensors to provide data on what crew members may experience during a trip to the Moon. The first mannequin, called "Captain Moonikin Campos" (named after Arturo Campos, a NASA engineer during the Apollo program), occupied the commander's seat inside Orion and was equipped with two radiation sensors in its Orion Crew Survival System suit, which astronauts will wear during launch, entry, and other dynamic phases of their missions. The commander's seat also had sensors to record acceleration and vibration data during the mission.

Alongside Moonikin were two phantom torsos, "Helga" and "Zohar" (named by the German Aerospace Center and the Israel Space Agency respectively), who took part in the Matroshka AstroRad Radiation Experiment (MARE), in which NASA, together with the German Aerospace Center and the Israel Space Agency, measured the radiation exposure during the mission. Zohar was shielded with the Astrorad radiation vest and equipped with sensors to determine radiation risks. Helga did not wear a vest. The phantoms measured the radiation exposure of body location, with both passive and active dosimeters distributed at sensitive and high stem cell-concentration tissues. The test provided data on radiation levels during missions to the Moon while testing the effectiveness of the vest. In addition to the three mannequins, Orion carried a plush doll of NASA's Snoopy as zero-g indicator and a Shaun the Sheep toy representing the ESA's European Service Module contribution to the mission.

Besides these functional payloads, Artemis I also carried commemorative stickers, patches, seeds, and flags from contractors and space agencies worldwide. A technology demonstration called Callisto, named after the mythical figure associated with Artemis, developed by Lockheed Martin in collaboration with Amazon and Cisco, was also aboard. Callisto used video conferencing software to transmit audio and video from mission control and used the Amazon Alexa virtual assistant to respond to the audio messages. In addition, the public could submit messages to be displayed on Callisto during the mission.

=== Cubesats ===
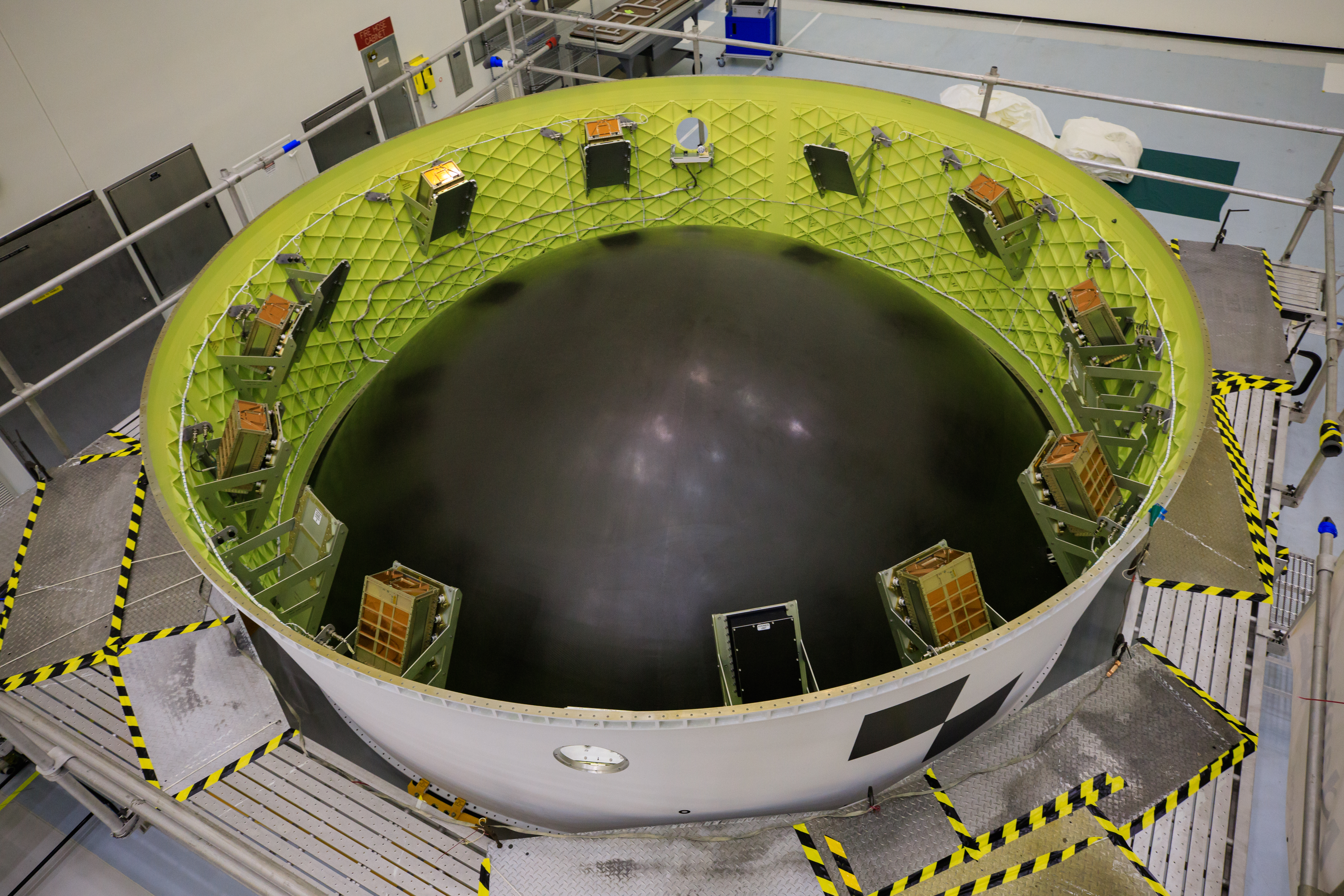
Orion spacecraft's stage adapter with nine out of ten CubeSats installed.

Ten low-cost CubeSats, all in six-unit configurations, flew as secondary payloads. They were carried within the Stage Adapter above the second stage. Two were selected through NASA's Next Space Technologies for Exploration Partnerships, three through the Human Exploration and Operations Mission Directorate, two through the Science Mission Directorate, and three from submissions by NASA's international partners. These CubeSats were:

- ArgoMoon, designed by Argotec and coordinated by the Italian Space Agency, was designed to image the Interim Cryogenic Propulsion Stage.
- BioSentinel contains yeast cards that are rehydrated in space, designed to detect, measure, and compare the effects of deep space radiation. In August 2023, NASA extended BioSentinel's mission into November 2024.
- CubeSat for Solar Particles, designed by the Southwest Research Institute, was to orbit the Sun in interplanetary space and study its particle and magnetic activity. Contact was lost soon after launch and never recovered.
- EQUULEUS, designed by Japan's JAXA and the University of Tokyo, was to image the Earth's plasmasphere, impact craters on the Moon's far side, and conduct small trajectory maneuvers near the Moon. EQUULEUS filmed the Green Comet C/2022 E3 (ZTF) in February 2023.
- Lunar IceCube, a lunar orbiter designed by Morehead State University, was to use its infrared spectrometer to detect water and organic compounds in the lunar surface and exosphere. Contact was lost soon after launch.
- Lunar Polar Hydrogen Mapper ("LunaH-Map"), selected by the NASA SIMPLEx program, A lunar orbiter designed by Arizona State University was to search for evidence of lunar water ice inside permanently shadowed craters using its neutron detector. The engines failed to ignite and after months of unsuccessful recovery attempts the satellite was declared lost.
- Near-Earth Asteroid Scout, designed by NASA's Jet Propulsion Laboratory, was a solar sail that would have flown by a near-Earth asteroid. Communications with the spacecraft were not successful and after many efforts, NEA Scout was considered lost.
- OMOTENASHI, designed by JAXA, a lunar probe which would have attempted to land using solid rocket motors, but failed to function properly and the landing sequence was never started.
- LunIR, designed by Lockheed Martin, performed a flyby of the Moon to collect its surface thermography. An "unexpected issue with the radio signal" kept the spacecraft from conducting any observations during the flyby.
- Team Miles, designed by Fluid and Reason LLC, was planned to demonstrate low-thrust plasma propulsion in deep space. Team Miles was deployed but contact was not established with the spacecraft.

Three other CubeSats were originally planned to launch on Artemis I but missed the integration deadline and will have to find alternative flights to the Moon. The stage adapter contained thirteen CubeSat deployers in total.

- Cislunar Explorers would demonstrate the viability of water electrolysis propulsion and interplanetary optical navigation to orbit the Moon. It was designed by Cornell University, Ithaca, New York.
- Lunar Flashlight was a lunar orbiter that would seek exposed water ice and map its concentration at the 1–2 km (0.62–1.24 mi) scale within the permanently shadowed regions of the lunar south pole. Lunar Flashlight was remanifested to launch as a rideshare with the Hakuto-R Mission 1 on a Falcon 9 Block 5. The launch took place on December 11, 2022. A failure of the craft's propulsion system resulted in Lunar Flashlight being unable to enter orbit around the Moon and NASA terminated the mission on May 12, 2023.
- Earth Escape Explorer would demonstrate long-distance communications while in heliocentric orbit. It was designed by the University of Colorado Boulder.

== Public outreach ==
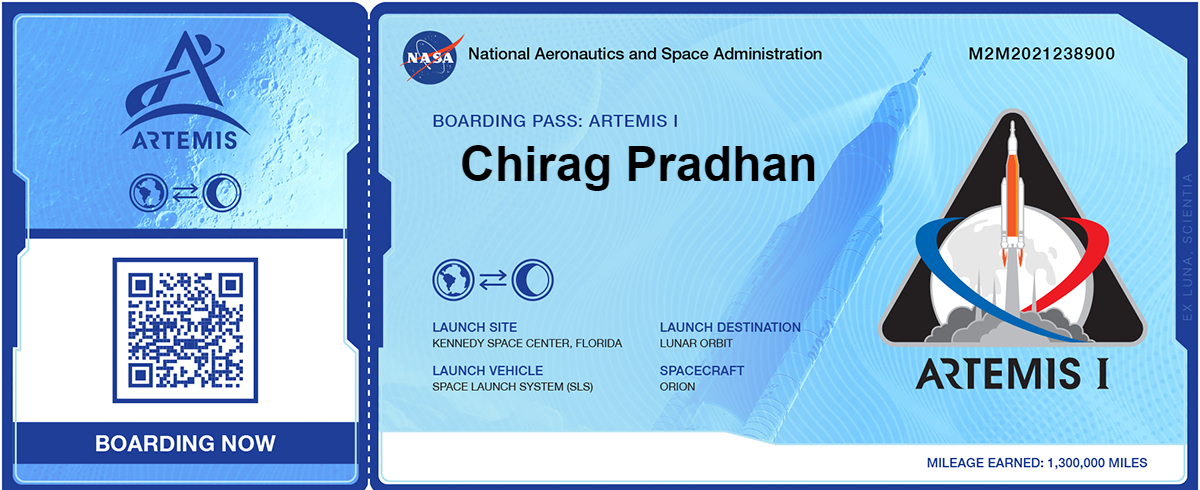
Sample souvenir boarding pass for those who registered their names to be flown aboard the Artemis I mission.

The Artemis I mission patch was created by NASA designers of the SLS, Orion spacecraft and Exploration Ground Systems teams. The silver border represents the color of the Orion spacecraft; at the center, the SLS and Orion are depicted. Three lightning towers surrounding the rocket symbolize Launch Complex 39B, from which Artemis I was launched. The red and blue mission trajectories encompassing the white full Moon represent Americans and people in the European Space Agency who work on Artemis I.

The Artemis I flight is frequently marketed as the beginning of Artemis's "Moon to Mars" program, though there is no concrete plan for a crewed mission to Mars within NASA as of 2022. To raise public awareness, NASA made a website for the public to get a digital boarding pass of the mission. The names submitted were written to a flash drive stored inside the Orion spacecraft. Also aboard the capsule is a digital copy of the 14,000 entries for the Moon Pod Essay Contest hosted by Future Engineers for NASA.

== See also ==
- List of Artemis missions
- List of missions to the Moon
