= Lunar Flashlight =

Lunar orbiter by NASA

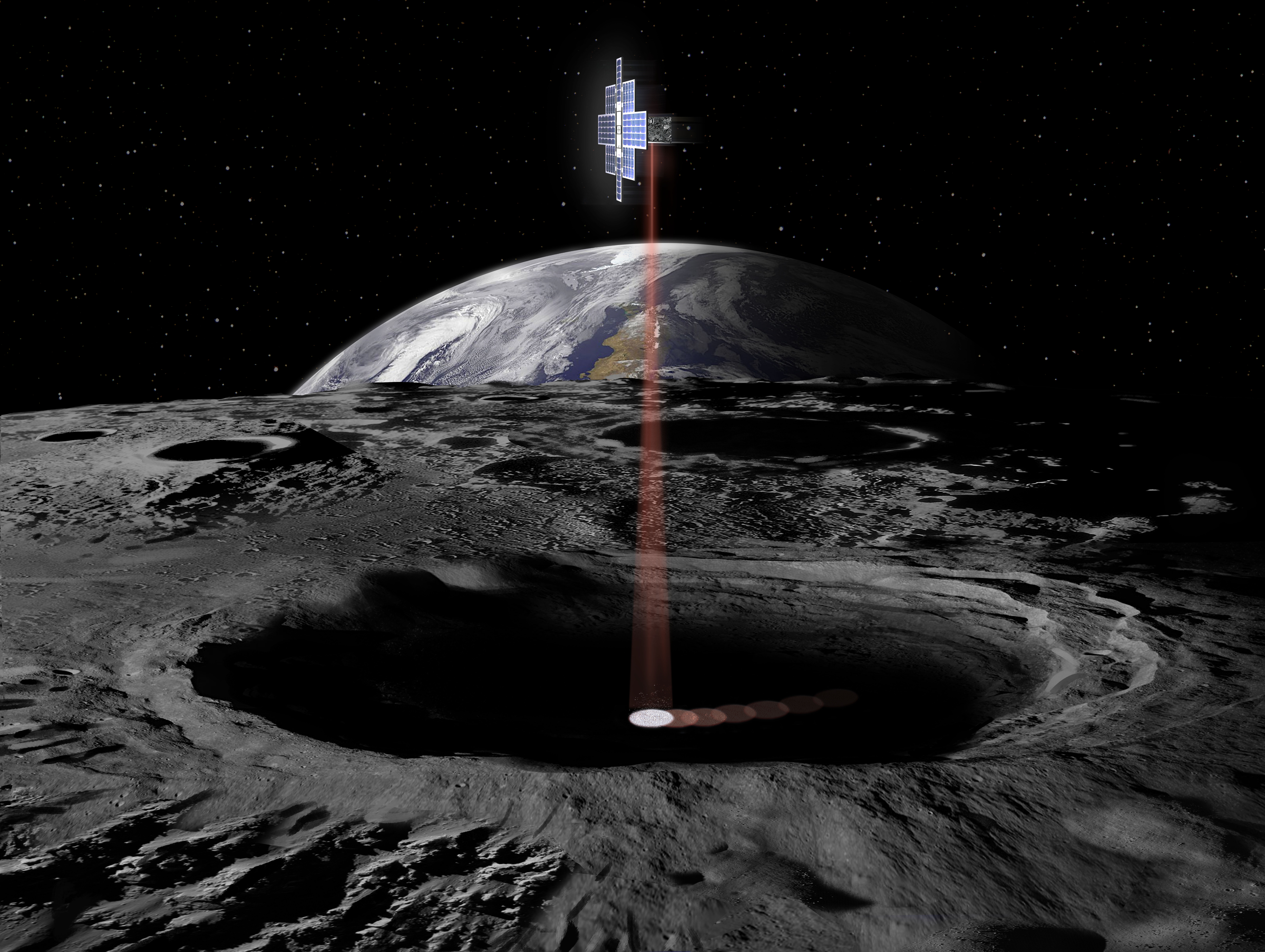
- Artist's impression of Lunar Flashlight orbiting the Moon
- Mission type: Lunar orbiter
- Operator: NASA
- COSPAR ID: 2022-168B
- SATCAT no.: 54697
- Website: www.jpl.nasa.gov/cubesat/missions/lunar_flashlight.php
- Mission duration: 2 years (planned); 5 months, 1 day (final)

Spacecraft properties
- Spacecraft: Lunar Flashlight
- Spacecraft type: CubeSat
- Bus: CubeSat (6U)
- Manufacturer: Jet Propulsion Laboratory
- Launch mass: >14 kg (31 lb)

Start of mission
- Launch date: 11 December 2022, 07:38:23 UTC
- Rocket: Falcon 9 Block 5
- Launch site: Cape Canaveral Space Force Station SLC-40
- Contractor: SpaceX

End of mission
- Disposal: Decommissioned
- Last contact: 12 May 2023

Orbital parameters
- Reference system: Heliocentric

Transponders
- Band: X-band
- Capacity: >10 kbps

Lunar Flashlight was a low-cost CubeSat lunar orbiter mission to explore, locate, and estimate size and composition of water ice deposits on the Moon for future exploitation by robots or humans.

The spacecraft, of the 6U CubeSat format, was developed by a team from the Jet Propulsion Laboratory (JPL), the Goddard Space Flight Center (GSFC), the Georgia Institute of Technology (GT), and NASA Marshall Space Flight Center. It was selected in early 2015 by NASA's Advanced Exploration Systems (AES) for launch in 2022 as a secondary payload for the Artemis 1 mission, though it missed the integration window to be included on the mission. Lunar Flashlight was remanifested to launch as a rideshare with the Hakuto-R Mission 1 on a Falcon 9 Block 5. The launch took place on 11 December 2022.

A failure of the craft's propulsion system resulted in Lunar Flashlight being unable to enter orbit around the Moon and NASA terminated the mission on May 12, 2023. The spacecraft has since been abandoned in a solar orbit after flying by Earth on May 17 for a coincidental gravity assist.

== History ==
NASA's Lunar Crater Observation and Sensing Satellite (LCROSS), the Lunar Reconnaissance Orbiter (LRO) and India's Chandrayaan-1 lunar orbiters and other missions discovered in 2009 both water (H_{2}O) and hydroxyl (—OH^{−}) deposits at high latitudes on the lunar surface, indicating the presence of trace amounts of adsorbed or bound water are present. These missions suggest that there might be enough ice water at polar regions to be used by future landed missions, but the distribution is difficult to reconcile with thermal maps.

Lunar prospecting missions are intended to pave the way toward incorporating use of space resources into mission architectures. NASA's planning for eventual human mission to Mars depends on tapping the local natural resources to make oxygen and propellant for launching the return ship back to Earth, and a lunar precursor mission is a convenient location to test such in situ resource utilization (ISRU) technology.

The mission concept was developed by a team from the Jet Propulsion Laboratory (JPL), the University of California, Los Angeles (UCLA), and NASA Marshall Space Flight Center and proposed to NASA's FY2014 Advanced Exploration Systems (AES) call. The mission was selected for funding in early 2015.

=== Spacecraft design ===
In its original conception, the Lunar Flashlight spacecraft would have been a 6U CubeSat format or bus propelled by an 80 m^{2} solar sail that would also have functioned as reflector to illuminate some selected permanently shadowed areas on the Moon, while an onboard infrared spectrometer measured the reflected spectrum diagnostic of surface compositional mix among rock/dust, regolith, water ice, CO_{2}, methane ice (CH_{4}), and possibly ammonia ice (NH_{3}). The illuminated spot would have been about 400 m (1,300 ft) in diameter, reflected from an altitude of 20 km (12 mi).

In the final design, the Lunar Flashlight spacecraft includes two sets of solar arrays. One set delivered by Blue Canyon Technologies (BCT) which deploys upon release from the dispenser and another delivered by MMA which use a burnwire deployment mechanism. The Command and Data Handling is provided via the JPL-developed Sphinx processor with flight software written using the JPL-developed FPrime software framework. The on-board radio is an Iris radio developed by JPL and build by Space Dynamics Laboratory. The attitude determination and control system (ADCS) for the spacecraft is provided by a BCT XACT-50. The spacecraft includes a chemical propulsion system to provide the impulse needed for Lunar Orbital Insertion (LOI). This propulsion system was designed and built by Georgia Tech’s Glenn Lightsey Research Group in collaboration with the NASA Marshall Space Flight Center. Finally, the science instrument payload is a compact Short Wave Infrared (SWIR) Laser reflectometer.

== Overview and objectives ==
The goal of Lunar Flashlight is to determine the presence or absence of exposed water ice and its physical state, and map its concentration at the 1-2 kilometer scale within the permanently shadowed regions of the lunar south pole. The mission will be one of the first CubeSats to reach the Moon, and the first mission to use lasers to look for water ice. Any polar volatile data collected by Lunar Flashlight could then ensure the most appropriate landing sites for a more expensive rover to perform in situ measurements and chemical analyses. The spacecraft will maneuver to its lunar polar orbit and use its near infrared lasers to shine light into the shaded polar regions, while the on-board spectrometer measures surface reflection and composition. Barbara Cohen from the NASA Goddard Space Flight Center is the principal investigator.

== Scientific payload ==
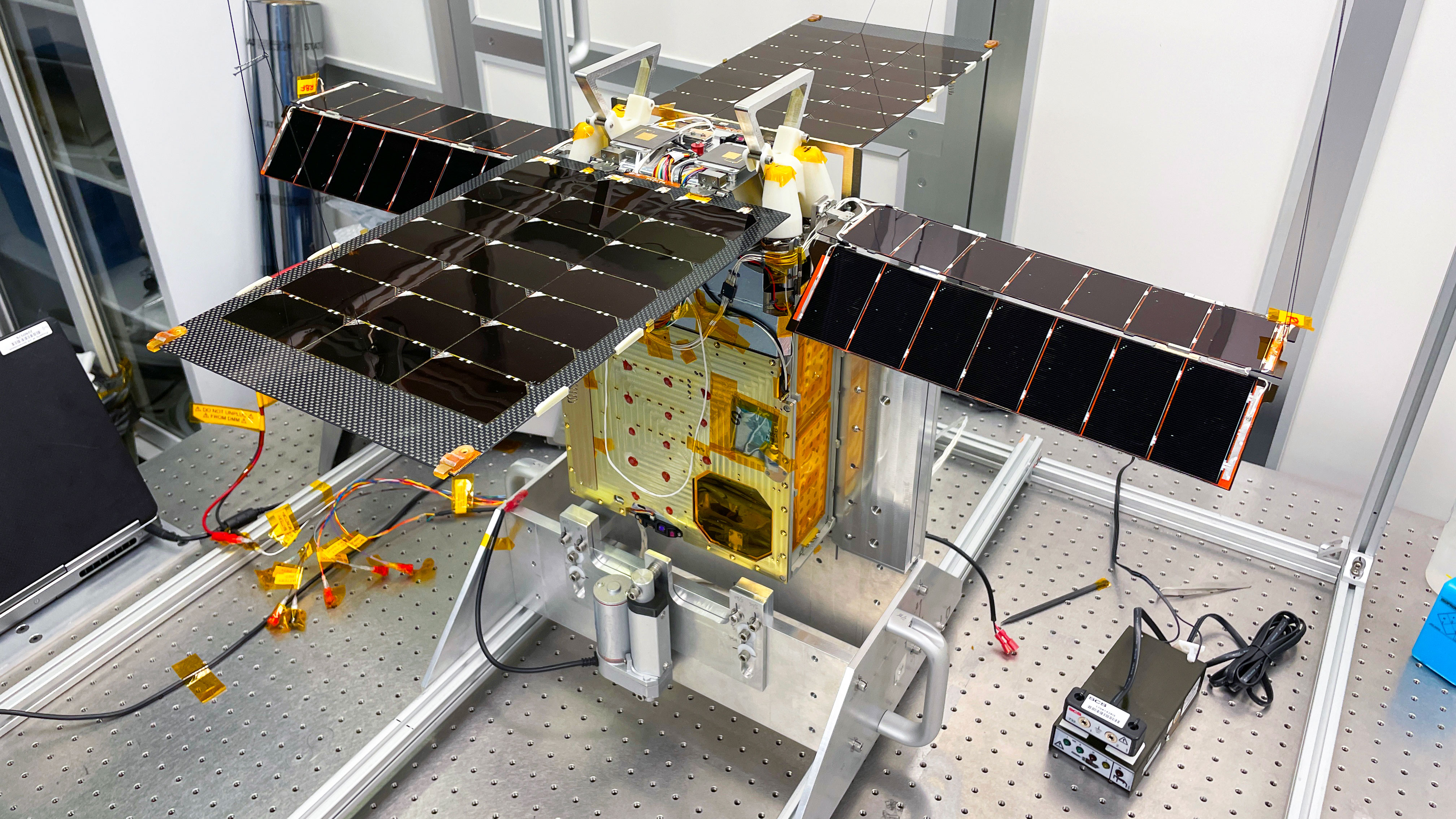
Lunar Flashlight after integration

The proposed payload on this nanosatellite is an infrared spectrometer, consisting of a lens, dichroic beam splitters and multiple single-element detectors. It occupies 2 of the 6 modules of the 6U CubeSat bus. The attitude control system (Blue Canyon Technologies' XACT-50), command and data handling, and power systems will occupy 1.5U; the Iris telecom system will occupy 0.5U.

The Lunar Flashlight payload is derived from a few predecessor systems, including JPL's INSPIRE (Interplanetary Nano-Spacecraft Pathfinder In Relevant Environment), MarCO (Mars Cube One) and JPL's experience with spectrometers, including the Moon Mineralogy Mapper (M3). The 6U CubeSat bus will use mostly commercial-off-the-shelf (COTS) components such as the lithium ion batteries, the CPU board, HaWK solar panels produced by MMA Design LLC, star tracker and 3-axis reaction wheels for attitude control. The CPU is a "Rad-Tol Dependable Multiprocessor". JPL will provide the Iris transponder that provides timing, navigation and telecommunication in the X band, which is to be monitored with the NASA Deep Space Network.

== Spacecraft design and trajectory ==
The Lunar Flashlight spacecraft was ejected from the Falcon 9 second stage after trans-lunar injection, after which it used a Sun sensor and solar panels to power the 3-axes reaction wheels. It also featured a chemical monopropellant propulsion and orientation system built by the Georgia Tech Space System Design Laboratory. The propulsion system occupied 3U of volume including 2 kg (4.4 lb) of AF-M315E (ASCENT) monopropellant, a less toxic HAN-based monopropellant being used in lieu of hydrazine. The intricate propellant management unit was fabricated using additive manufacturing. The propulsion system had four 100 mN thrusters mounted on the base of the spacecraft, fed by miniature electric gear pump. Gear pump was developed and built by Flight Works, Inc. company. AF-M315E monopropellant was stored in a low-pressure conformal tank, more compact and lightweight than usual high-pressure tanks for pressure-fed propulsion systems.

=== Thruster problems ===
During the first few days of flight (December 2022), it was found that 3 of the 4 thrusters were underperforming. As of January 2023 the mission team was working to remedy the problem. Limited success was achieved with the other 3 thrusters by May 2023, but the final effort to recover thrust by running the propellant pump at high speed has probably ruptured a feed line, and further attempts were abandoned.

Possible cause of thrusters underperformance is theorized to be debris blocking the feed lines between thruster valves and thruster feed tubes. It is suspected that passages in the additively manufactured manifold were not cleaned properly from residual metal powder after the powder bed fusion process.

=== Orbit ===
The spacecraft was planned to be the second to use a near-rectilinear halo orbit, the first being the CAPSTONE mission. The original concept proposed a trajectory that would target multiple lunar flybys, and possibly include an Earth gravity assist; it would have been captured into a lunar polar orbit one or two months after launch, depending on the selected trajectory.

Animation of Lunar Flashlight - An original plan

Around the Earth

Frame rotating with Moon - Viewed from Earth

Lunar Flashlight · Earth · Moon

== See also ==
- Lunar water
- List of missions to the Moon

The 10 CubeSats that flew in the Artemis 1 mission

- Near-Earth Asteroid Scout by NASA was a solar sail spacecraft that was planned to encounter a near-Earth asteroid (mission failure)
- BioSentinel was an astrobiology mission
- LunIR by Lockheed Martin Space
- Lunar IceCube, by the Morehead State University
- CubeSat for Solar Particles (CuSP)
- Lunar Polar Hydrogen Mapper (LunaH-Map), designed by the Arizona State University
- EQUULEUS, submitted by JAXA and the University of Tokyo
- OMOTENASHI, submitted by JAXA, was a lunar lander (mission failure)
- ArgoMoon, designed by Argotec and coordinated by Italian Space Agency (ASI)
- Team Miles, by Fluid and Reason LLC, Tampa, Florida

The 3 CubeSat missions that were not loaded onto Artemis 1

- Lunar Flashlight was planned to map exposed water ice on the Moon (mission failure)
- Cislunar Explorers, Cornell University, Ithaca, New York
- Earth Escape Explorer (CU-E^{3}), University of Colorado Boulder
