= Barbara Cohen (scientist) =

American planetary scientist

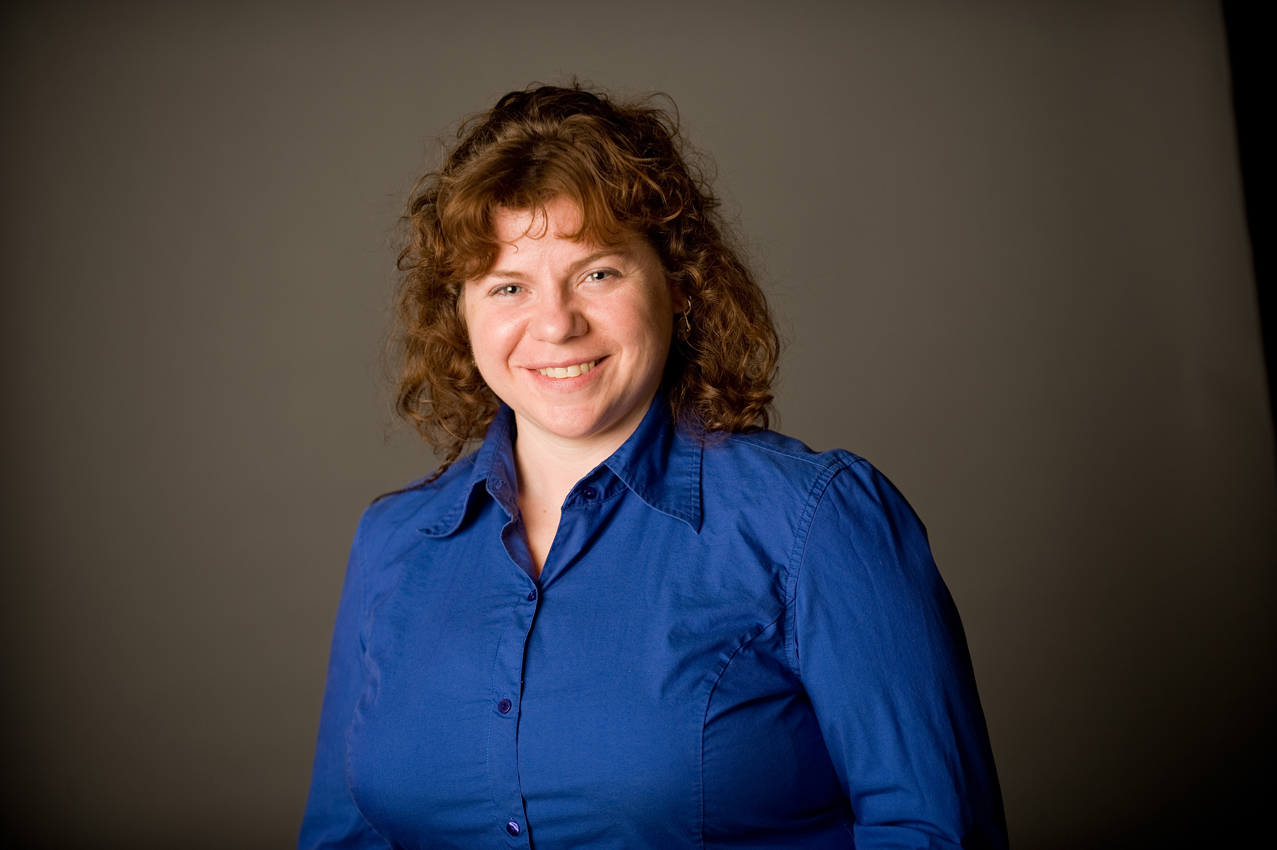
- Cohen at Marshall Space Flight Center in 2010
- Education: State University of New York; University of Arizona
- Scientific career
- Workplaces: Goddard Space Flight Center Marshall Space Flight Center; University of New Mexico; University of Hawaii University of Tennessee

Barbara Cohen is a planetary scientist at NASA's Goddard Space Flight Center. The asteroid 6816 Barbcohen is named after her.

== Education ==
Cohen is from upstate New York. She earned a bachelor's degree in geology from State University of New York at Stony Brook in 1993. She joined Phi Beta Kappa during her studies. She moved to the University of Arizona for her doctoral studies, where she received a University of Arizona Graduate College Fellowship and NASA Graduate Student Research Program Fellowship, and graduated in 2000. Here Cohen looked to understand impact rates on the moon using microbeam analysis and Argon–argon dating of lunar meteorites. She identified that clastic rock in lunar meteorites are different from samples from Apollo, and have ages consistent with Late Heavy Bombardment. While at the University of Arizona, she also led a study into various physical properties of chili.

== Career ==
Cohen joined the University of Tennessee as a postdoctoral researcher, where she worked on analysis of lunar samples such as Dhofar 025 and Dhofar 026 with Larry Taylor. She moved to the University of Hawaii, where she worked with Klaus Keil on geochronology of Luna 20 samples. In 2003 she joined the University of New Mexico as an assistant professor.

In 2007 Cohen joined Marshall Space Flight Center to support the planning for human exploration of the Moon for the Lunar Precursor Robotic Program. She led the MSFC planetary science team and was the lead US project scientist for the International Lunar Network, a proposed mission to understand the Moon's composition. She is the Principal Investigator of the Marshall Space Flight Center (now Mid-Atlantic) Noble Gas Research Laboratory (MNGRL), using noble-gas isotopes to understand the temperature-time histories of rocks and meteorites. The MNGRL lab is being used to analyze Apollo samples that have been opened for the first time in 50 years. Conscious that the MNGRL was so large, she developed a rover-sized Potassium-argon laser experiment (KArLE).

Cohen is the principal investigator for the Lunar Flashlight mission, a CubeSat mission aboard the first flight of the Space Launch System that will search for water ice on the Moon. She is the principal investigator for PITMS, a mass spectrometer manifested on the first Commercial Lunar Payload Services (CLPS) mission, and a co-Investigator on Heimdall and SAMPLR, instruments that will fly on a subsequent CLPS mission.

Cohen was Associate Principal Investigator of the Mars rovers Spirit and Opportunity, where she was identifying the nature and origins of Martian impact material. She is a member of the science team for the Curiosity rover and is a Returned Sample Scientist for the Perseverance rover mission.

She has volunteered for several missions to search for Antarctic meteorites (ANSMET). Cohen contributed to "The Scientific Context for Exploration of the Moon", a 2008 National Academies of Sciences, Engineering, and Medicine report. In 2010 Cohen featured in the Faces of Marshall campaign. She was part of a group who created the 2013 Planetary Science Decadal Survey, which provided a roadmap for planetary science missions and priorities. In 2016 she took part in a Reddit "Ask Me Anything" (AMA). In 2017 Cohen joined Goddard Space Flight Center.

Cohen is a member of the American Geophysical Union and has been part of several committees. She is a member of The Planetary Society. Cohen won the 2018 Angioletta Coradini Mid-Career Award from NASA's Solar System Exploration Research Virtual Institute (SSERVI). She is a 2018 Fellow of the Meteoritical Society.
