= ILN =

ILN can refer to:

- International Lunar Network
- International Location Number, see Global Location Number
- Wilmington Air Park, formerly known as Airborne Airpark
- The Illustrated London News
- International Lawyer's Network
