= Jawahar Point =

Moon Impact Probe's hard landing site

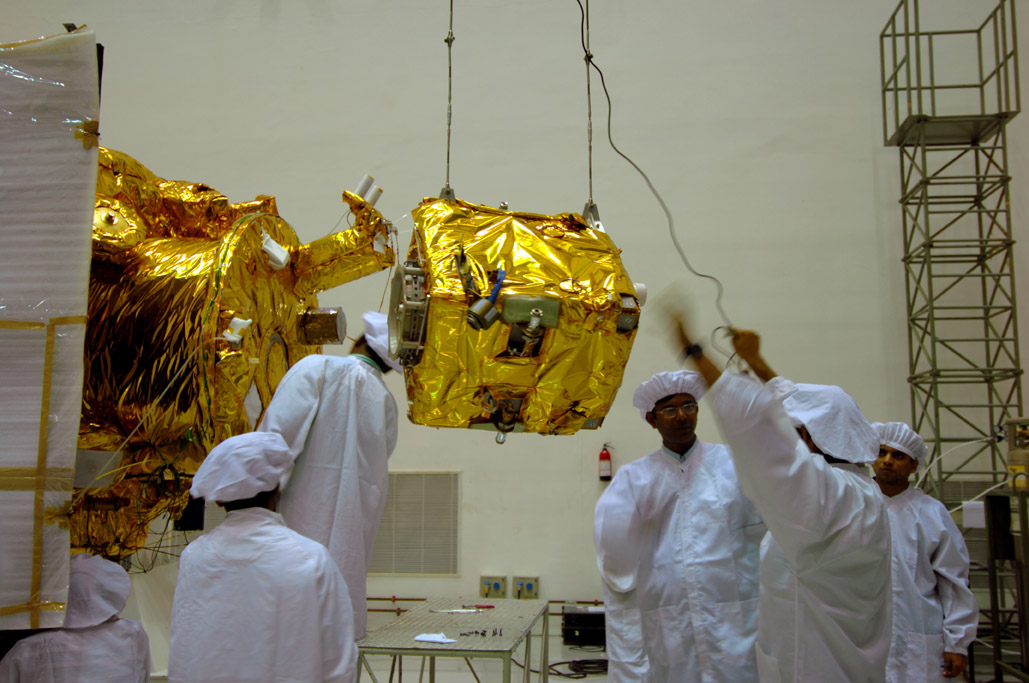
Moon Impact Probe being integrated with Chandrayaan-1 orbiter

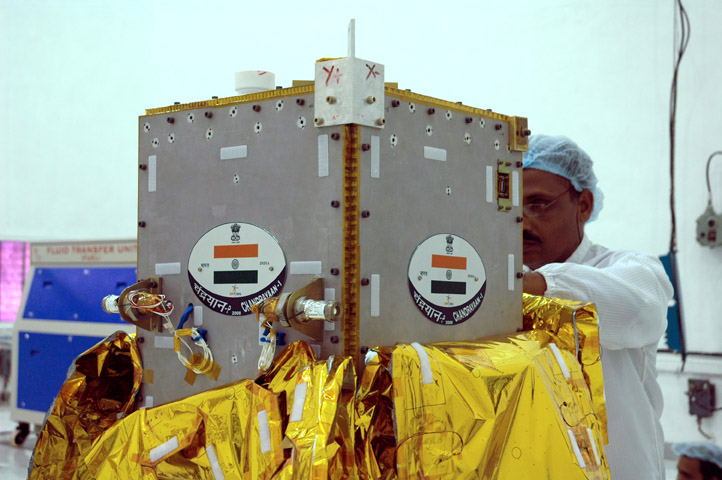
Moon Impact Probe being worked on before integration with orbiter

Jawahar Point or Jawahar Sthal is the site near the Shackleton Crater where the Moon Impact Probe (MIP) of the Chandrayaan-1 hard landed on lunar surface on 14 November 2008. The name was reportedly suggested by India's former President A. P. J. Abdul Kalam as the MIP touched the Moon on the birth anniversary of India's first prime minister Jawaharlal Nehru.

== Site location ==
The approximate location of impact location of the probe was initially mentioned to be (89.76°S 39.40°W) but it was later refined to the Earth-facing slope of the connecting ridge between Shackleton (crater) and De Gerlache (crater) near (89.55°S 122.93°W) by matching images from MIP camera to LROC NAC image mosaic. The exact location of MIP impact point is not known.

== See also ==
- Chandrayaan programme
- Statio Shiv Shakti
- Tiranga Point
