= Lunar Precursor Robotic Program =

Program of robotic spacecraft missions

The Lunar Precursor Robotic Program (LPRP) is a NASA program that uses robotic spacecraft to prepare for future crewed missions to the Moon. The program gathers data such as lunar radiation, surface imaging, areas of scientific interest, temperature and lighting conditions, and potential resource identification.

Two LPRP missions, the Lunar Reconnaissance Orbiter (LRO) and the Lunar Crater Observation and Sensing Satellite (LCROSS), were launched in June 2009. The lift-off above Cape Canaveral Air Force Station in Florida on June 18, 2009, was successful. The uncrewed Atlas V rocket launched the two space probes towards the Moon, where they will provide a 3D map and search for water in conjunction with the Hubble Space Telescope, launching on June 17, 2009.

This lunar program marked the first United States mission to the Moon in over ten years. Neil Armstrong's first step on the Moon occurred on July 20, 1969, and this launch was 32 days before its 40th anniversary. The LRO entered a low orbit around the Moon, while the LCROSS mission performed a "swing-by" and entered a different orbit to set up a collision with the Moon's surface several months later. The projected lunar impact of the Centaur and LCROSS spacecraft was on October 9, 2009, at 11:30 UT (7:30 a.m. EDT, 4:30 a.m. PDT), ± 30 minutes. The plume from the Centaur impact was predicted by NASA to be visible through telescopes with apertures as small as 10 to 12 inches (300 mm).

== Program history ==
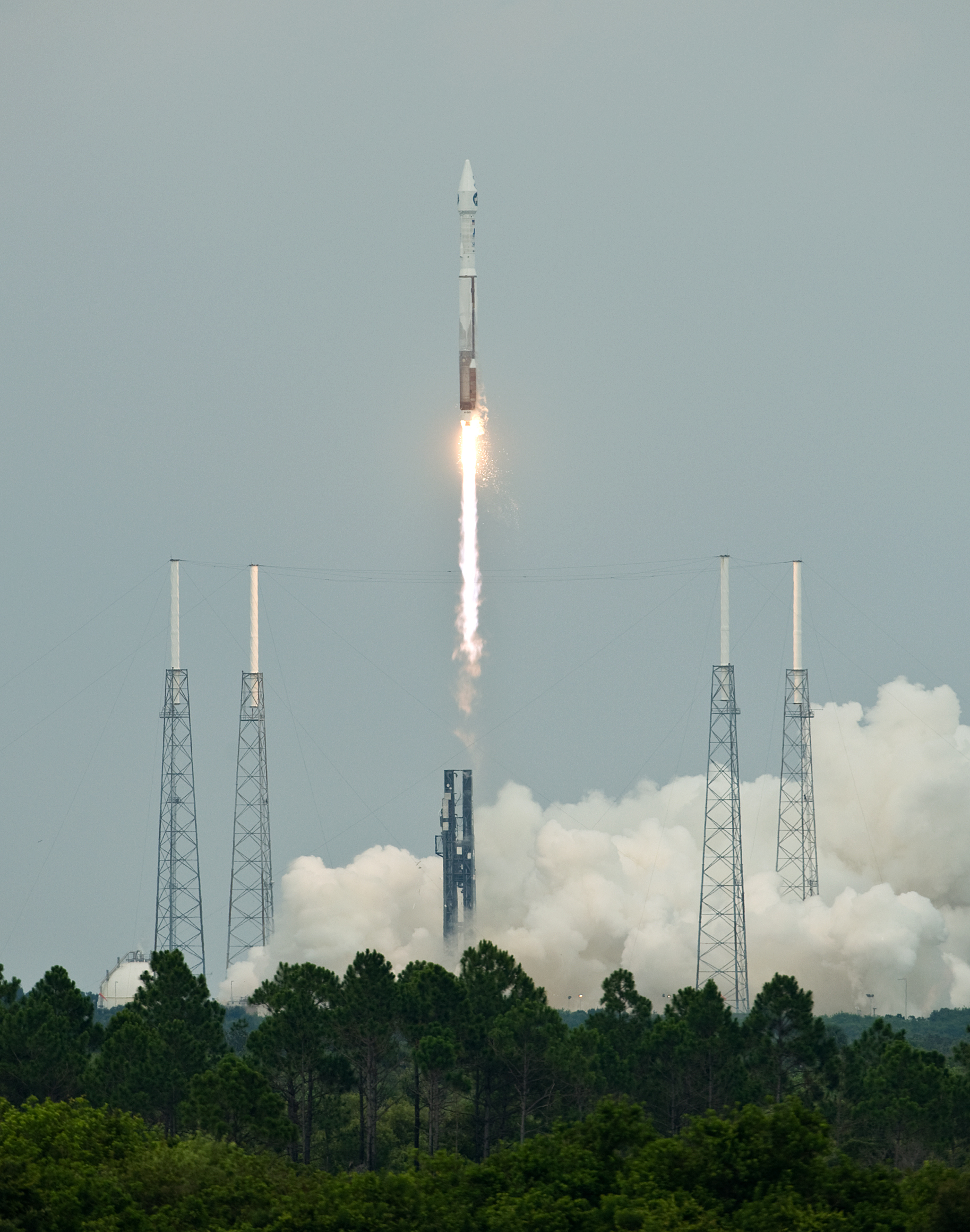
The Atlas V-Centaur rocket carrying the LRO and LCROSS just after takeoff.

Initially, the LPRP program was a part of the Science Mission Directorate of NASA (SMD) and was called the Robotic Lunar Exploration Program (RLEP). Management of the RLEP program was assigned to Goddard Space Flight Center (GSFC) in February 2004. At that time, the Program's goal was to "...initiate a series of robotic missions to the Moon to prepare for and support future human exploration activities."

In 2005, responsibility for RLEP was moved to NASA's Exploration Systems Mission Directorate (ESMD) and management was assigned to the Ames Research Center (ARC). In 2006, the program was renamed the Lunar Precursor Robotic Program and management responsibility was reassigned to the Marshall Space Flight Center (MSFC). The US$583 million space mission comes equipped with a $504 million 4,200 pounds (1,900 kg) LRO space probe and a $79 million LCROSS satellite.

=== LRO ===
The Lunar Reconnaissance Orbiter (LRO) is the first mission of the LPRP program. Management of the LRO was assigned to Goddard Space Flight Center (GSFC) in 2004. The LRO launched on an Atlas V 401 rocket from Cape Canaveral Air Force Station on June 18, 2009, at 5:32 p.m. EDT (2132 GMT). The planned liftoff at 5:12 p.m. EDT (2112 GMT) was delayed by 20 minutes due to thunderstorms. The LRO was scheduled to orbit the Moon for one year, gathering high-resolution images of the lunar surface that would allow the creation of detailed maps. The LRO's goals included finding safe landing sites for human visits to the Moon, identifying lunar resources, studying the lunar radiation environment, and providing a 3D map of the Moon's surface to allow astronauts to return to the Moon by 2020. The LRO carried seven main instruments, including the Cosmic Ray Telescope for the Effects of Radiation (CRaTER), the Diviner Lunar Radiometer Experiment (DLRE), the Lyman-Alpha Mapping Project (LAMP), the Lunar Exploration Neutron Detector (LEND), the Lunar Orbiter Laser Altimeter (LOLA), the Lunar Reconnaissance Orbiter Camera (LROC), and the Miniature Radio Frequency radar (Mini-RF).

=== LCROSS ===
The Lunar Crater Observation and Sensing Satellite (LCROSS) mission is to be launched with the LRO. It was selected as a secondary payload in 2006, and management of the program was assigned to Ames Research Center (ARC). The mission will explore a permanently shadowed region of a lunar pole by crashing the 2,300 pounds (1,000 kg) spent Centaur rocket upper stage of the Atlas V launch vehicle into a dark crater. The composition of the ejecta plume will be observed by a shepherding spacecraft, which will itself crash-land 4 minutes later, creating a second plume. NASA expects the impact velocity will be over 9,000 km/h (5,600 mph). The ejecta plume will weigh in the order of 350 tons (317 metric tons) and rise 6 miles (9.7 km) from the surface.

=== LADEE ===
The Lunar Atmosphere and Dust Environment Explorer (LADEE) launched on September 7, 2013. LADEE studied the lunar exosphere and dust in the Moon's vicinity.

== Future projects ==
For a hypothetical International Lunar Network, NASA and international partners planned to land two stations on the lunar surface. Their objective was to establish a robotic set of geophysical monitoring stations on the surface and, eventually, in lunar orbit as well.

== Data processing ==
The Lunar Mapping and Modeling project is using the obtained data to develop detailed topographic maps of the lunar surface that support lunar science, exploration, commercial, educational, and public outreach activities. In addition, solar radiation levels will be mapped and modelled. These integrated data will be used by NASA to make decisions about, for example, lunar outpost designs.

== See also ==
- Exploration of the Moon
- List of future lunar missions
- Lunar ice
- Mars Reconnaissance Orbiter
