= SIR-2 =

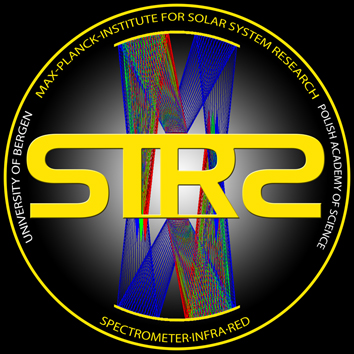
SIR-2 Mission Logo

The SIR-2 instrument is a redesigned, highly compact, monolithic grating, near infrared spectrometer chosen to be a payload on the Indian Chandrayaan-1 satellite. It is an ESA project, and is built by Max Planck Institute for Solar System Research, Polish Academy of Sciences and University of Bergen.

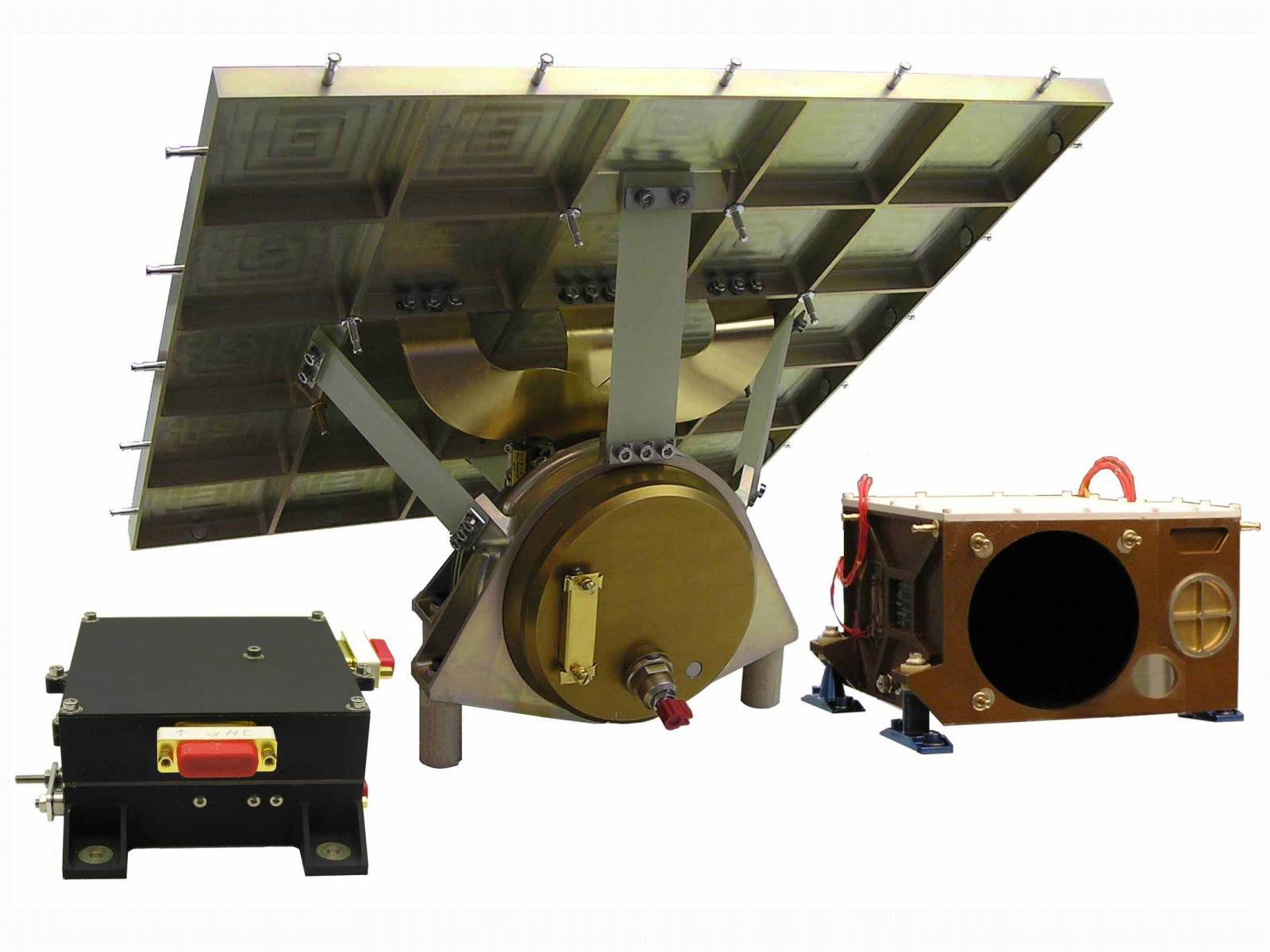
SIR-2 Instrument parts

== Mission ==
The mission of the instrument is to map the lunar surface in the near infrared spectrum from 0.9 - 2.4 μm with an unprecedented resolution of 6 nm. The purpose of this is to obtain information on the mineral composition of the moon, which in turn will help getting insight into a number of questions:

- What is the cause of the global asymmetry of the moon, which on the far side has a thicker crust and lacks the Mare structures which are characteristic for the near side?
- What was the early thermal evolution of the moon?
- What is the vertical and lateral structure of the lunar crust and how did it develop?
- What is the composition and structure of the lunar mantle?
- Why is the moon different from other planets and how do planets work in terms of surface processes, heat transfer, and geologic evolution?
- Are the Apollo geophysical measurements representative of the moon, or are they only valid for the small regions around the Apollo landing sites?

=== Similar missions ===
The instrument is a redesigned version of SIR, which was flown on board the SMART-1 technology satellite. SIR performed the same mission, but had a problem with dark current induced noise due to varying temperatures caused by differences in heat flux from the light and dark side of the Moon. SIR-2 will attempt to improve this, mainly by using a detector with an embedded thermoelectric cooler and a digital controller to keep the detector temperature stable. This will stabilize the dark current noise, making it simple to subtract it since it will have an almost constant level.

== Electronics ==
The control unit of SIR-2 is based on a System-on-a-chip design, minimizing the size and power consumption of the unit. A central component is the radiation hardened RTAX2000S Axcelerator FPGA, containing a LEON (LEON3FT) SPARC compliant CPU, communications interface Intellectual property cores, and custom interfaces to the rest of the instrument.
