= Moon Impact Probe =

Lunar robotic craft developed by ISRO

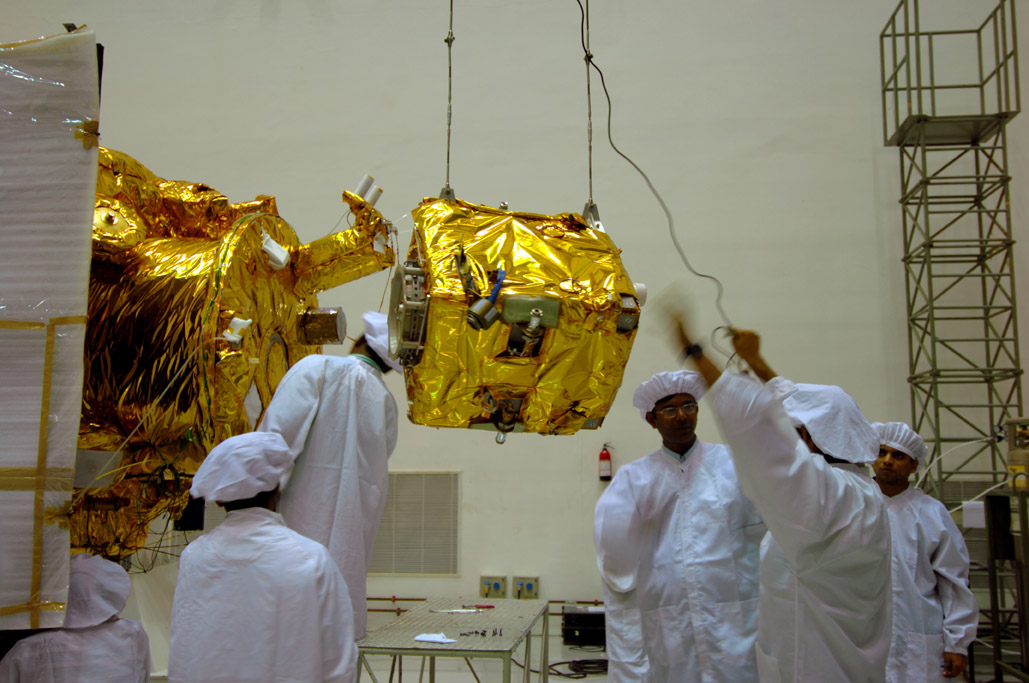
Moon Impact Probe being integrated with Chandrayaan-1 orbiter

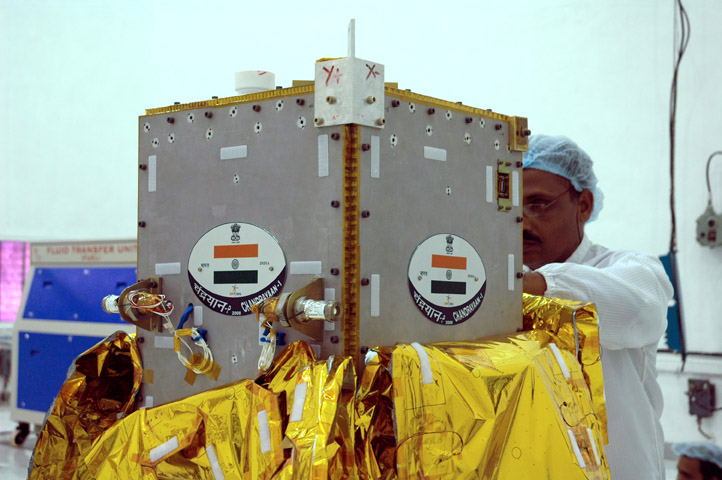
Moon Impact Probe being worked on before integration with orbiter

The Moon Impact Probe (MIP) developed by the Indian Space Research Organisation (ISRO), India's national space agency, was a lunar probe that was released by ISRO's Chandrayaan-1 lunar remote sensing orbiter which in turn was launched, on 22 October 2008, aboard a modified version of ISRO's Polar Satellite Launch Vehicle. It discovered the presence of water on the Moon.

The Moon Impact Probe separated from the Moon-orbiting Chandrayaan-1 on 14 November 2008, 14:36:54 UTC and after nearly 25 minutes hard landed as planned, near the rim of Shackleton Crater. With this mission, ISRO became the fifth national space agency to reach the lunar surface. Other nations whose national space agencies to have done so prior were the former Soviet Union in 1959, the United States in 1962, Japan in 1993, and ESA member states in 2006.

== History ==
The probe was a product of former President Abdul Kalam's suggestion who felt that since the Chandrayaan orbiter was already going so near to the Moon, the mission would have more scientific relevance if the probe was included. He believed that the Moon could not be left to a few countries and that India should not be left behind The Times of India also reported a political motive by former president Abdul Kalam as "He believed that if this was done, India could always stake a claim to a portion of the Moon." At the same time, The Indian Express reported Kalam as saying "no nation can claim the Moon as its own. The resources of the Moon should be a common property and that is one of the aims of the Moon mission."

== Mission objectives ==
The main objectives of the MIP were to demonstrate the technologies for reaching a specified location on the Moon, qualifying technologies required for any future soft landing missions, and scientific exploration of the Moon from close range just prior to the impact.

== Configuration and payloads ==
The MIP carried three instruments:

- Radar Altimeter – which measured the altitude of the probe during descent and provided information on qualifying technologies for future landing missions. The operating frequency band was 4.3 GHz ± 100 MHz.
- Video Imaging System – acquired close range images of the surface of the Moon during descent and before impact. The video imaging system consisted of an analog CCD camera.
- Mass Spectrometer based payload CHACE – measured trace constituents of the lunar atmosphere during descent. This instrument was a quadrupole mass spectrometer with a mass resolution of 0.5 amu and sensitivities to partial pressures on the order of 1.3×10^{−11} pascals.

The probe used aluminium-honeycomb sandwich structure onto which the payloads were mounted. The probe was attached to the orbiter with a ball lock separation system which jettisoned the unit from the Chandrayaan. A solid propellant de-orbit mortar nudged the craft out of lunar orbit, while solid propellant based thrusters were fired to spin-stabilize the orientation enabling the imaging system to capture the descent profile.

The probe's external surface had four oval-shaped anodised aluminium plates measuring 120 by 180 millimetres (4.7 in × 7.1 in) on which the image of the Indian flag was depicted, complete with the Emblem of India and the words "Satyameva Jayate". These plates were attached to each one of the four vertical sides of the probe. As per ISRO specifications these plates had to endure a temperature range from −50 °C (−58 °F) and as high as more than 150 °C (302 °F).

== Mission chronology ==
India launched the Chandrayaan-1 spacecraft using a modified version of the PSLV C11 on 22 October 2008 from Satish Dhawan Space Centre, Sriharikota, Andhra Pradesh at 06:22 IST (00:52 UTC).

The lunar probe separated from Chandrayaaan-1, in a 102 kilometres (63 mi) circular polar orbit around the Moon, at 20:06 IST on 14 November 2008. After separation, it first fired its spin up rockets and then its retro rocket to de-orbit itself into the lunar surface. While descending, the MIP continuously sent information back to the Chandrayaan-1 orbiter which in turn beamed the information back to Earth. After a 25-minute descent, it struck the Moon at 20:31 IST, 14 November 2008 at a speed of 1.69 kilometres per second (1.05 mi/s) (approximately 6,100 kilometres per hour [3,800 mph]). It crashed into Shackleton Crater, at the lunar south pole, near 89.55°S 122.93°W, at 20:31 on 14 November 2008.

== Discovery of water ==
On 25 September 2009, ISRO announced that the MIP had discovered water on the Moon during its descent just before impact. This announcement was made after the discovery of water was announced on 24 September 2009 by Science magazine by the NASA payload Moon Mineralogy Mapper carried on board Chandrayaan-1. MIP discovered water on the Moon before NASA's Moon Mineralogy Mapper, the announcement of this discovery was not made until NASA confirmed it.

== Site location and naming ==
The approximate impact location of the probe (89.76°S 39.40°W) was named as Jawahar Sthal in India after the first Prime Minister of India, on whose birth anniversary incidentally the event of MIP impact took place. The name was suggested by A. P. J. Abdul Kalam to honor his vision that was crucial to the creation of INCOSPAR and later ISRO.

The initial location was later refined to the Earth-facing slope of the connecting ridge between Shackleton (crater) and De Gerlache (crater) near coordinates (89.55°S 122.93°W) by matching images from MIP camera to LROC NAC image mosaic.

== See also ==
- Chandrayaan-1
- LCROSS
- List of missions to the Moon
- Lunar water
- List of artificial objects on the Moon
