= Moon Mineralogy Mapper =

NASA instrument carried by Chandrayaan I to moon

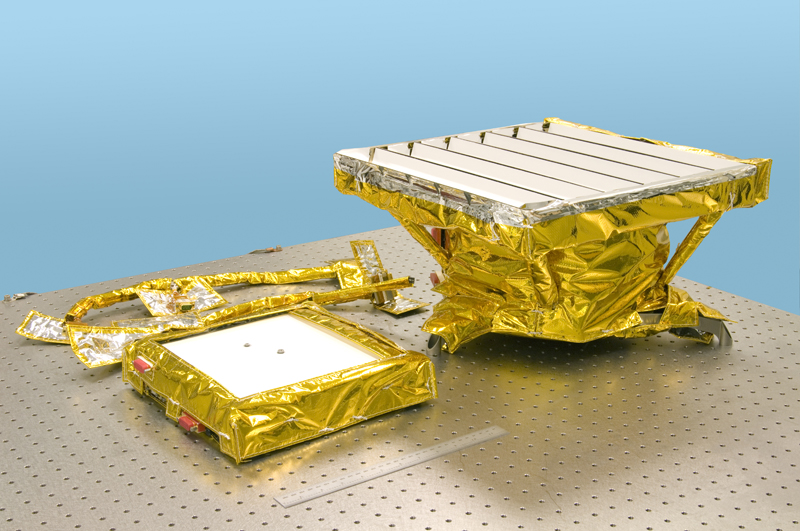
- Left side of the Moon Mineralogy Mapper
- Operator: NASA
- Manufacturer: JPL
- Instrument type: Imaging spectrometer
- Mission duration: 712 days (planned); 333 (actual)
- Began operations: November 12, 2008
- Ceased operations: September 20, 2009
- Website: www.jpl.nasa.gov/missions/moon-mineralogy-mapper-m3/

Properties
- Mass: 8.2 kg (18 lb)
- Resolution: 40 km (25 mi) (field of view); 140 m (460 ft) (global); 70 m (230 ft) (targeted)

Host spacecraft
- Spacecraft: Chandrayaan-1
- Operator: ISRO
- Launch date: 00:52, October 22, 2008 (UTC)
- Rocket: PSLV-C11
- Launch site: Satish Dhawan Space Centre
- COSPAR ID: 2008-052A

The Moon Mineralogy Mapper (M^{3}) is one of two instruments of NASA that was carried by India's first mission to the Moon, Chandrayaan-1, launched October 22, 2008. It is an imaging spectrometer, and the team is led by Principal investigator Carle Pieters of Brown University, and managed by NASA's Jet Propulsion Laboratory (JPL).

== Description ==
M^{3}	Performance/units
Type	Imaging spectrometer
Spectral range	430–3,000 nm
Spectral channels	260 (10 nm/channel)
Field of view	40 km
Resolution	70 m/pixel
Mass	8.2 kg
Power	<20 W
Dimensions	50 × 50 × 50 cm

M^{3} is an imaging spectrometer that provided the first high-resolution spatial and spectral map of the entire lunar surface, revealing the minerals of which it is made. This information will both provide clues to the early development of the Solar System and guide future astronauts to stores of precious resources.

This instrument is a Discovery Program "Mission of Opportunity" (a NASA-designed instrument on board another space agency's spacecraft).

Chandrayaan-1 operated for 312 days as opposed to the intended two years but the mission achieved many of its planned objectives. M^{3} was used to map over 95% of the lunar surface in its low-resolution Global mode, but only a small fraction in the high-resolution Target mode. After suffering from several technical issues including failure of the star sensors and poor thermal shielding, Chandrayaan-1 stopped sending radio signals at 1:30 AM IST on 29 August 2009 shortly after which, the ISRO officially declared the mission over.

=== HVM^{3} ===
The design of the M^{3} instrument was used as the basis for the HVM^{3} instrument on the unsuccessful Lunar Trailblazer mission. HVM^{3} was a pushbroom short-wave infrared imaging spectrometer. The Lunar Trailblazer spacecraft was launched on 27 February 2025, but NASA lost contact with the spacecraft. The mission ended on July 31, 2025 after all attempts to contact the spacecraft were unsuccessful.

== Science team ==
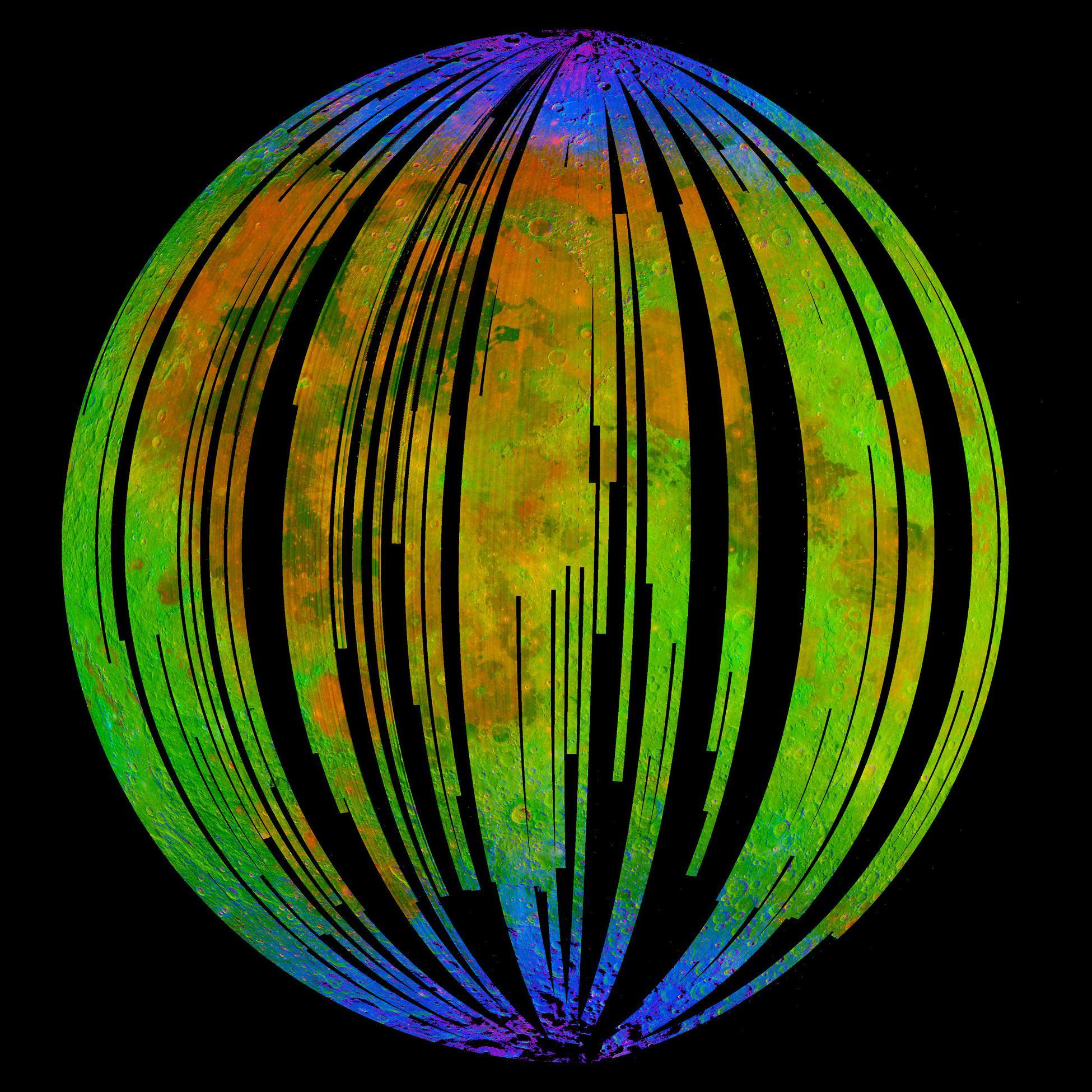
Mosaic of images of the Moon taken by the Moon Mineralogy Mapper. Blue shows the signature of water, green shows the brightness of the surface as measured by reflected infra-red radiation from the sun and red shows an iron-bearing mineral called pyroxene.

- Carle M. Pieters, Brown University – PI (principal investigator)
- Joe Boardman, Analytical Imaging and Geophysics, LLC
- Bonnie Buratti, JPL
- Roger Clark, USGS
- Robert Green, JPL
- Jim Head, Brown University
- Sarah Lundeen, JPL – Instrument Ground Data System
- Erick Malaret, ACT
- Tom McCord, University of Hawaii
- Jack Mustard, Brown University
- Cass Runyon, College of Charleston
- Matt Staid, Planetary Science Institute
- Jessica Sunshine, University of Maryland
- Larry Taylor, University of Tennessee
- Stefanie Tompkins, SAIC
- Padma Varanasi, JPL – Mission Operations

=== Water discovered on Moon ===
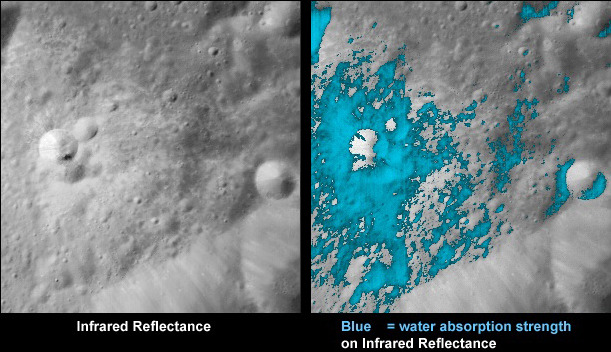
These images show water in a very young lunar crater on the side of the Moon that faces away from Earth.

On September 24, 2009, Science magazine reported that NASA's Moon Mineralogy Mapper (M^{3}) on Chandrayaan-1 had detected water on the Moon. But, on 25 September 2009, ISRO announced that the MIP, another instrument on-board Chandrayaan-1 also had discovered water on the Moon just before impact and had discovered it before M^{3}. The announcement of this discovery was not made until NASA confirmed it.

M^{3} detected absorption features near 2.8–3.0 μm on the surface of the Moon. For silicate bodies, such features are typically attributed to OH- and/or H_{2}O-bearing materials. On the Moon, the feature is seen as a widely distributed absorption that appears strongest at cooler high latitudes and at several fresh feldspathic craters. The general lack of correlation of this feature in sunlit M^{3} data with neutron spectrometer H abundance data suggests that the formation and retention of OH and H_{2}O is an ongoing surficial process. OH/H_{2}O production processes may feed polar cold traps and make the lunar regolith a candidate source of volatiles for human exploration.

The Moon Mineralogy Mapper (M^{3}), an imaging spectrometer, was one of the 11 instruments on board Chandrayaan-I that came to a premature end on August 29. M^{3} was aimed at providing the first mineral map of the entire lunar surface.

Lunar scientists have for decades contended with the possibility of water repositories. They are now increasingly "confident that the decades-long debate is over," a report says. "The moon, in fact, has water in all sorts of places; not just locked up in minerals, but scattered throughout the broken-up surface, and, potentially, in blocks or sheets of ice at depth." The results from the NASA's Lunar Reconnaissance Orbiter are also "offering a wide array of watery signals."

The detailed analysis of the full set of Moon Mineralogy Mapper data in 2018 has yielded multiple locations with water ice concentrations at the surface ranging from 2% to 30%, at latitudes above 70 degrees. Surprisingly, some of the known "cold traps", including the impact site of the LCROSS spent stage, have failed to detect surface ice.

== Mg-spinel-rich rock discovered ==
M^{3} found a rock dominated by Mg-spinel with no detectable pyroxene or olivine present (<5%) occurring along the western inner ring of Moscoviense Basin (as one of several discrete areas). The occurrence of this spinel does not easily fit with current lunar-crustal evolution models.
