= Chandrayaan-1 =

Indian lunar mission (2008–2009)

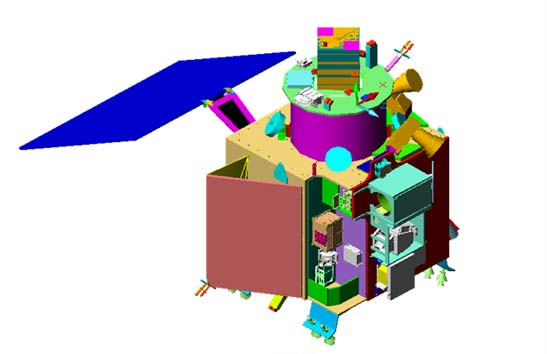
- Mission type: Lunar orbiter and Impactor
- Operator: ISRO
- COSPAR ID: 2008-052A
- SATCAT no.: 33405
- Website: www.isro.gov.in/Chandrayaan_1.html
- Mission duration: Planned: 2 years Final: 10 months, 6 days

Spacecraft properties
- Manufacturer: ISRO
- Launch mass: 1,380 kg (3,040 lb)
- Dry mass: 560 kg (1,230 lb)
- Payload mass: 105 kg (231 lb)

Start of mission
- Launch date: 22 October 2008, 00:52 UTC
- Rocket: PSLV-XL C11
- Launch site: Satish Dhawan Space Centre
- Contractor: ISRO

End of mission
- Last contact: 28 August 2009, 20:00 UTC

Orbital parameters
- Reference system: Selenocentric
- Semi-major axis: 1,758 kilometers (1,092 mi)
- Eccentricity: 0.0
- Periselene altitude: 200 km (120 mi)
- Aposelene altitude: 200 km (120 mi)
- Epoch: 19 May 2009

Lunar orbiter
- Orbital insertion: 8 November 2008
- Orbits: 3,400 at EOM

Chandrayaan-1 (from Sanskrit: Chandra, "Moon" and yāna, "craft, vehicle") of the Chandrayaan programme, was the first Indian lunar probe. It was launched by ISRO in October 2008, and operated until August 2009. The mission consisted of an orbiter and an impactor. ISRO launched the spacecraft using a PSLV-XL (C-11) rocket on 22 October 2008 at 00:52 UTC from Satish Dhawan Space Centre (SDSC), at Sriharikota, Andhra Pradesh. The mission was a major boost to India's space program, as India researched and developed its own technology to explore the Moon. The vehicle was inserted into lunar orbit on 8 November 2008.

On 14 November 2008, the Moon Impact Probe separated from the Chandrayaan orbiter at 14:36 UTC and struck the south pole in a controlled manner. The probe hit near the crater Shackleton at 15:01 UTC. The location of the impact was named Jawahar Point. With this mission, ISRO became the fifth national space agency to reach the lunar surface. Other nations whose national space agencies achieved similar feats were the former Soviet Union in 1959, the United States in 1962, Japan in 1993, and European Space Agency member states in 2006.

The estimated cost for the project was ₹386 crore (US$88.73 million). It was intended to survey the lunar surface for over two years, to produce a complete map of the chemical composition at the surface and its three-dimensional topography. The polar regions were of special interest as there was a high chance of finding water ice. One of its many achievements was the discovery of the widespread presence of water molecules in lunar soil.

After almost a year, the orbiter started experiencing several technical issues including failure of the star tracker and poor thermal shielding; Chandrayaan-1 stopped communicating at about 20:00 UTC on 28 August 2009, shortly after which the ISRO officially declared that the mission was over. Chandrayaan-1 operated for 312 days as opposed to the intended two years; however, the mission achieved most of its scientific objectives, including detecting the presence of Lunar water.

On 2 July 2016, NASA used ground-based radar systems to relocate Chandrayaan-1 in its lunar orbit, almost seven years after it shut down. Repeated observations over the next three months allowed a precise determination of its orbit which varies between 150 and 270 km (93 and 168 mi) in altitude every two years.

== History ==
Former Prime Minister of India, Atal Bihari Vajpayee, announced the Chandrayaan 1 project The mission was a major boost to India's space program. The idea of an Indian scientific mission to the Moon was first raised in 1999 during a meeting of the Indian Academy of Sciences. The Astronautical Society of India (ASI) began planning the implementation of such an idea in 2000. Soon after, the Indian Space Research Organisation (ISRO) set up the National Lunar Mission Task Force. The Task Force decided that the ISRO had the technical expertise to carry out an Indian mission to the Moon. In April 2003, over 100 Indian scientists spanning fields from planetary science, space sciences, Earth sciences, physics, chemistry, astronomy, astrophysics, engineering, and communication sciences discussed and approved the Task Force recommendation to launch an Indian probe to the Moon. Six months later, in November, the Vajpayee government formally approved the mission.

== Objectives ==
The mission had the following objectives:

- To design, develop, launch, and orbit a spacecraft around the Moon using an Indian-made launch vehicle
- To conduct scientific experiments using instruments on the spacecraft which would yield data:
  - for the preparation of a three-dimensional atlas (with high spatial and altitude resolution of 5–10 m or 16–33 ft) of both the near and far sides of the Moon
  - for chemical and mineralogical mapping of the entire lunar surface at a high spatial resolution, mapping particularly the chemical elements magnesium, aluminum, silicon, calcium, iron, titanium, radon, uranium, and thorium
- To increase scientific knowledge
- To test the impact of a sub-satellite (Moon Impact Probe – MIP) on the surface of the Moon as a forerunner for future soft-landing missions

=== Goals ===
To reach its objective, the mission defined these goals:

- High-resolution mineralogical and chemical imaging of the permanently shadowed north- and south-polar regions
- To search for surface or subsurface lunar water ice, especially at the lunar poles
- Identification of chemicals in lunar highland rocks
- Chemical stratigraphy of the lunar crust by remote sensing of the central uplands of large lunar craters, and of the South Pole Aitken Region (SPAR), an expected site of interior material
- Mapping the height variation of features of the lunar surface
- Observation of X-ray spectrum greater than 10 keV and stereographic coverage of most of the Moon's surface with 5 m (16 ft) resolution

== Specifications ==
Diagram of the Chandrayaan-1 spacecraft

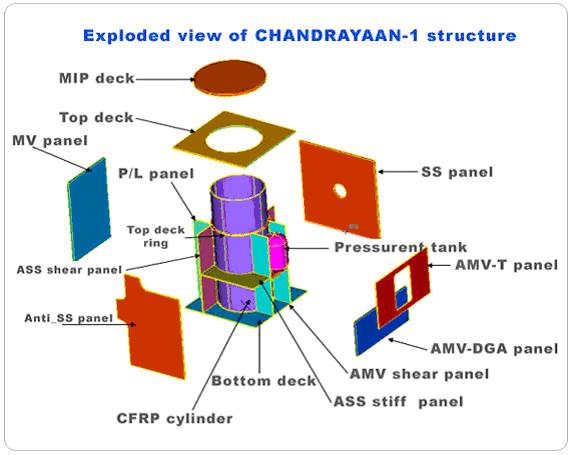
Spacecraft bus for Chandrayaan One overview

Mass
1,380 kg (3,042 lb) at launch, 675 kg (1,488 lb) at lunar orbit, and 523 kg (1,153 lb) after releasing the impactor.
Dimensions
Cuboid in shape of approximately 1.5 m (4.9 ft)
Communications
X band, 0.7 m (2.3 ft) diameter dual gimballed parabolic antenna for payload data transmission. The Telemetry, Tracking & Command (TTC) communication operated in S band frequency.
Power
The spacecraft was mainly powered by its solar array, which included one solar panel covering a total area of 2.15 × 1.8 m (7.1 × 5.9 ft) generating 750 W of peak power, which was stored in a 36 Ampere-hour(A·h) lithium-ion battery for use during eclipses.
Propulsion
The spacecraft used a bipropellant integrated propulsion system to reach lunar orbit as well as orbit and altitude maintenance while orbiting the Moon. The power plant consisted of one 440 Newton(N) engine and eight 22 N thrusters. Fuel and oxidizer were stored in two tanks of 390 liters (100 U.S. gal) each.
Navigation and control
The craft was 3-axis stabilized with two star sensors, gyros, and four reaction wheels. The spacecraft carried dual redundant bus management units for attitude control, sensor processing, antenna orientation, etc.

== Payload ==
The scientific payload had a mass of 90 kg (198 lb). The payload contained five Indian instruments and six instruments from other countries.

=== Indian instruments ===
- TMC or the Terrain Mapping Camera was a CMOS camera with 5 m (16 ft) resolution and a 40 km (25 mi) swath in the panchromatic band and was used to produce a high-resolution map of the Moon. This instrument aimed to completely map the topography of the Moon. The camera works in the visible region of the electromagnetic spectrum and captures black-and-white stereo images. When used in conjunction with data from the Lunar Laser Ranging Instrument (LLRI), it can help in a better understanding of the lunar gravitational field as well. TMC was built by the ISRO's Space Applications Centre (SAC) at Ahmedabad. The TMC was tested on 29 October 2008 through a set of commands issued from ISTRAC.
- HySI or Hyper Spectral Imager is a CMOS camera, that performs mineralogical mapping in the 400–900 nm band with a spectral resolution of 15 nm and a spatial resolution of 80 m (260 ft).
- LLRI or Lunar Laser Ranging Instrument determines the height of the surface topography by sending pulses of infrared laser light toward the lunar surface and detecting the reflected portion of that light. It operated continuously and collected 10 measurements per second on both the day and night sides of the Moon. LLRI was developed by the Laboratory for Electro-Optics Systems of ISRO, Bangalore. It was tested on 16 November 2008.
- HEX is a High Energy aj/gamma x-ray spectrometer for 30–200 keV measurements with a ground resolution of 40 km (25 mi), the HEX measured Uranium, Thorium, Lead-210, Radon-222 degassing, and other radioactive elements.
- MIP was developed by the ISRO is an impact probe that consists of a C-band Radar altimeter for measurement of the altitude of the probe, a video imaging system for acquiring images of the lunar surface, and a mass spectrometer for measuring the constituents of the lunar atmosphere. It was ejected at 14:30 UTC on 14 November 2008. As planned, the Moon Impact Probe impacted the lunar south pole at 15:01 UTC on 14 November 2008. ISRO was the fifth national space agency to reach the surface of the Moon. Other national space agencies to have done so prior were the former Soviet Union in 1959, the United States in 1962, Japan in 1993, and ESA in 2006.

=== Instruments from other countries ===
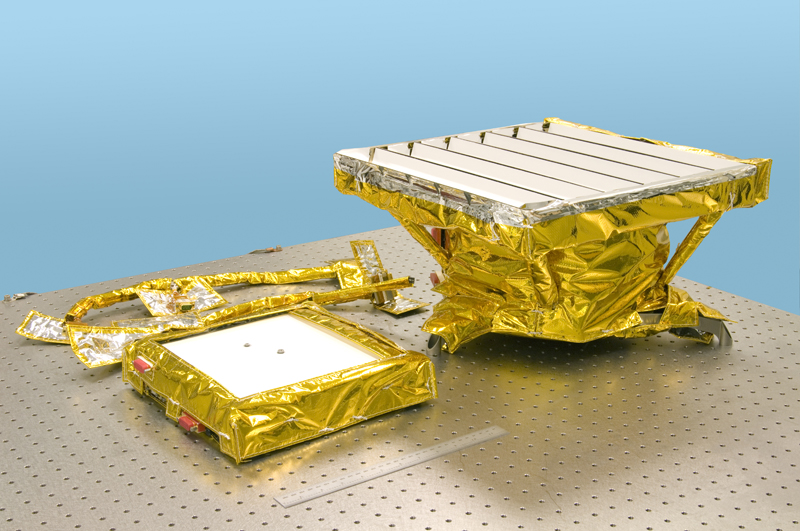
Moon Mineralogy Mapper (left)

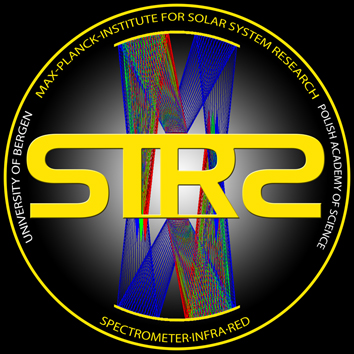
SIR-2 Logo

These international contributions were vital to the mission’s success and overall achievements of Chandrayaan 1.

- C1XS or X-ray fluorescence spectrometer covering 1–10 keV, mapped the abundance of Magnesium, Aluminium, Silicon, Calcium, Titanium, and Iron at the surface with a ground resolution of 25 km (16 mi), and monitored solar flux. This payload results from the collaboration between the Rutherford Appleton Laboratory, United Kingdom, European Space Agency (ESA) and ISRO. It was activated on 23 November 2008.
- SARA, the Sub-keV Atom Reflecting Analyser from the ESA mapped mineral composition using low energy neutral atoms emitted from the surface.
- M^{3}, the Moon Mineralogy Mapper from Brown University and Jet Propulsion Laboratory (JPL, funded by NASA) was an imaging spectrometer designed to map the surface mineral composition. It was activated on 17 December 2008.
- SIR-2, a near-infrared spectrometer from ESA, was built at the Max Planck Institute for Solar System Research, Polish Academy of Sciences, and University of Bergen. SIR-2 mapped the mineral composition using an infrared grating spectrometer. The instrument is similar to that of the Smart-1 SIR. It was activated on 19 November 2008 and scientific observations were started on 20 November 2008.
- Mini-SAR, designed, built, and tested for NASA by a large team that includes the Naval Air Warfare Center, Johns Hopkins University Applied Physics Laboratory, Sandia National Laboratories, Raytheon, and Northrop Grumman, with outer support from ISRO. Mini-SAR is the active Synthetic Aperture Radar system to search for lunar polar ice and water ice. The instrument transmitted right polarised radiation with a frequency of 2.5 GHz and monitored scattered left and right polarised radiation. The Fresnel reflectivity and the circular polarisation ratio (CPR) are the key parameters deduced from these measurements. Ice shows the Coherent Backscatter Opposition Effect, which results in an enhancement of reflections and CPR so that the water content of the Moon's polar regions can be estimated.
- RADOM-7, Radiation Dose Monitor Experiment from the Bulgarian Academy of Sciences mapped the radiation environment around the Moon. It was tested on 16 November 2008.

== Mission timeline ==
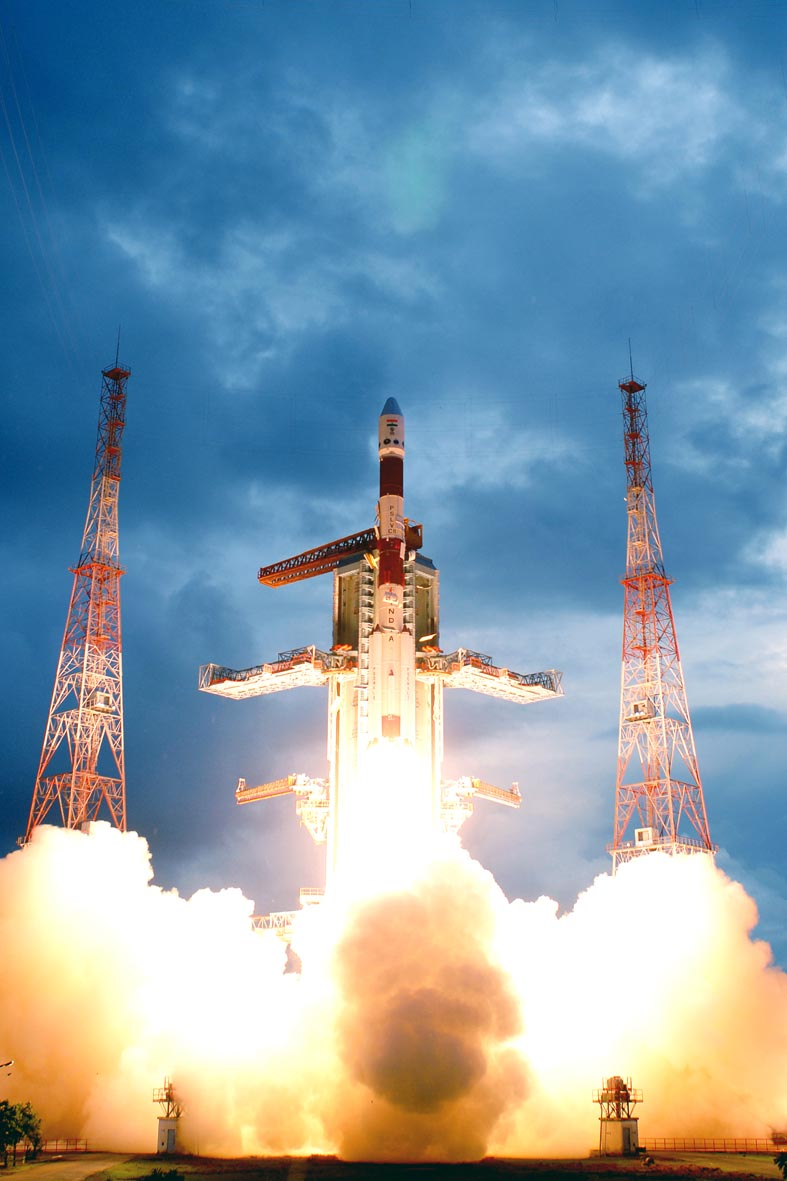
PSLV C11 carrying Chandrayaan-1

During the tenure of Prime Minister Manmohan Singh, the Chandrayaan project got a boost and finally Chandrayaan-1 was launched on 22 October 2008 at 00:52 UTC from Satish Dhawan Space Centre using the ISRO's 44.4-metre (146 ft) tall, four-stage PSLV C11 launch vehicle. Chandrayaan-1 was sent to the Moon in a series of orbit-increasing manoeuvres around the Earth over a period of 21 days as opposed to launching the craft on a direct trajectory to the Moon. At launch the spacecraft was inserted into geostationary transfer orbit (GTO) with an apogee of 22,860 km (14,200 mi) and a perigee of 255 km (158 mi). The apogee was increased with a series of five orbit burns conducted over a period of 13 days after launch.

For the duration of the mission, ISRO's telemetry, tracking and command network (ISTRAC) at Peenya in Bangalore, tracked and controlled Chandrayaan-1. Scientists from India, Europe, and the U.S. conducted a high-level review of Chandrayaan-1 on 29 January 2009 after the spacecraft completed its first 100 days in space.

=== Earth orbit burns ===
Earth orbit burns
Date (UTC)	Burn time (minutes)	Resulting apogee
22 October Launch	18.2 in four stages	22,860 km
23 October	18	37,900 km
25 October	16	74,715 km
26 October	9.5	164,600 km
29 October	3	267,000 km
4 November	2.5	380,000 km

First orbit burn

The first orbit-raising manoeuvre of the Chandrayaan-1 spacecraft was performed at 03:30 UTC on 23 October 2008 when the spacecraft's 440 Newton liquid engine was fired for about 18 minutes by commanding the spacecraft from Spacecraft Control Centre (SCC) at ISRO Telemetry, Tracking and Command Network (ISTRAC). With this Chandrayaan-1's apogee was raised to 37,900 km (23,500 mi), and its perigee to 305 km (190 mi). In this orbit, the Chandrayaan-1 spacecraft took about 11 hours to go around the Earth once.

Second orbit burn

The second orbit-raising manoeuvre of Chandrayaan-1 spacecraft was carried out on 25 October 2008 at 00:18 UTC when the spacecraft's engine was fired for about 16 minutes, raising its apogee to 74,715 km (46,426 mi), and its perigee to 336 km (209 mi), completing 20 percent of its journey. In this orbit, Chandrayaan-1 spacecraft took about twenty-five and a half hours to go round the Earth once. This was the first time an Indian spacecraft went beyond the 36,000 km (22,000 mi) high geostationary orbit and reached an altitude more than twice that height.

Third orbit burn

The third orbit raising manoeuvre was initiated on 26 October 2008 at 01:38 UTC when the spacecraft's engine was fired for about nine and a half minutes. With this its apogee was raised to 164,600 km (102,300 mi), and the perigee to 348 km (216 mi). In this orbit, Chandrayaan-1 took about 73 hours to go around the Earth once.

Fourth orbit burn

The fourth orbit-raising maneuver took place on 29 October 2008 at 02:08 UTC when the spacecraft's engine was fired for about three minutes, raising its apogee to 267,000 km (166,000 mi) and the perigee to 465 km (289 mi). This extended its orbit to a distance more than half the way to the Moon. In this orbit, the spacecraft took about six days to go around the Earth once.

Final orbit burn

The fifth and final orbit raising manoeuvre was carried out on 3 November 2008 at 23:26 UTC when the spacecraft's engine was fired for about two and a half minutes resulting in Chandrayaan-1 entering the Lunar Transfer Trajectory with an apogee of about 380,000 km (240,000 mi).

=== Lunar orbit insertion ===
Lunar orbit insertion
Date (UTC)	Burn time (seconds)	Resulting periselene	Resulting aposelene
8 November	817	504 km	7,502 km
9 November	57	200 km	7,502 km
10 November	866	187 km	255 km
11 November	31	101 km	255 km
12 November Final orbit		100 km	100 km

Chandrayaan-1 completed the lunar orbit insertion operation on 8 November 2008 at 11:21 UTC. This manoeuvre involved firing of the liquid engine for 817 seconds (about thirteen and half minutes) when the spacecraft passed within 500 km (310 mi) from the Moon. The satellite was placed in an elliptical orbit that passed over the polar regions of the Moon, with 7,502 km (4,662 mi) aposelene and 504 km (313 mi) periselene. The orbital period was estimated to be around 11 hours. With the successful completion of this operation, India became the fifth nation to put a vehicle in lunar orbit.

First orbit reduction

First Lunar Orbit Reduction Manoeuvre of Chandrayaan-1 was carried out on 9 November 2008 at 14:33 UTC. During this, the engine of the spacecraft was fired for about 57 seconds. This reduced the periselene to 200 km (124 mi) while aposelene remained unchanged at 7,502 kilometres (4,662 mi). In this elliptical orbit, Chandrayaan-1 took about ten and a half hours to circle the Moon once.

Second orbit reduction

This manoeuvre was carried out on 10 November 2008 at 16:28 UTC, resulting in a steep decrease in Chandrayaan-1's aposelene to 255 km (158 mi) and its periselene to 187 km (116 mi), During this manoeuvre, the engine was fired for about 866 seconds (about fourteen and a half minutes). Chandrayaan-1 took two hours and 16 minutes to go around the Moon once in this orbit.

Third orbit reduction

Third Lunar Orbit Reduction was carried out by firing the onboard engine for 31 seconds on 11 November 2008 at 13:00 UTC. This reduced the periselene to 101 km (63 mi), while the aposelene remained constant at 255 kilometres (158 mi). In this orbit Chandrayaan-1 took two hours and 9 minutes to go around the Moon once.

Final orbit

Chandrayaan-1 spacecraft was placed into a mission-specific lunar polar orbit of 100 km (62 mi) above the lunar surface on 12 November 2008. In the final orbit reduction manoeuvre, Chandrayaan-1's aposelene and periselene were both reduced to 100 kilometres (62 mi). In this orbit, Chandrayaan-1 takes about two hours to go around the Moon once. Two of the 11 payloads—the Terrain Mapping Camera (TMC) and the Radiation Dose Monitor (RADOM)—were switched on. The TMC acquired images of both the Earth and the Moon.

=== Impact of the MIP on the lunar surface ===
The MIP crash-landed on the lunar surface on 14 November 2008, 15:01 UTC near the crater Shackleton at the south pole. The MIP was one of eleven scientific instruments (payloads) on board Chandrayaan-1.

The MIP separated from Chandrayaan at 100 km from the lunar surface and began its nosedive at 14:36 UTC, going into free fall for thirty minutes. As it fell, it kept sending information back to the mother satellite which, in turn, beamed the information back to Earth. The altimeter then also began recording measurements to prepare for a rover to land on the lunar surface during a second Moon mission.

Following the deployment of the MIP, the other scientific instruments were turned on, starting the next phase of the mission.

After scientific analyses of the received data from the MIP, the Indian Space Research Organisation confirmed the presence of water in the lunar soil and published the finding in a press conference addressed by its then Chairman G. Madhavan Nair.

=== Rise of spacecraft's temperature ===
ISRO had reported on 25 November 2008 that Chandrayaan-1's temperature had risen above normal to 50 °C (122 °F), Scientists said that it was caused by higher than expected temperatures in lunar orbit. The temperature was brought down by about 10 °C (18 °F) by rotating the spacecraft about 20 degrees and switching off some of the instruments. Subsequently, ISRO reported on 27 November 2008 that the spacecraft was operating under normal temperature conditions. In subsequent reports ISRO says, since the spacecraft was still recording higher than normal temperatures, it would be running only one instrument at a time until January 2009 when lunar orbital temperature conditions are said to stabilize. It was initially thought that the spacecraft was experiencing high temperature because of radiation from the Sun and infrared radiation reflected by the Moon. However the rise in spacecraft temperature was later attributed to a batch of DC-DC converters with poor thermal regulation.

=== Mapping of minerals ===
The mineral content on the lunar surface was mapped with the Moon Mineralogy Mapper (M^{3}), a NASA instrument on board the orbiter. The presence of iron was reiterated and changes in rock and mineral composition have been identified. The Oriental Basin region of the Moon was mapped, and it indicates abundance of iron-bearing minerals such as pyroxene.

In 2018 it was announced that M^{3} infrared data had been re-analyzed to confirm the existence of water across wide expanses of the Moon's polar regions.

=== Mapping of Apollo landing sites ===
ISRO announced in January 2009 the completion of the mapping of the Apollo Moon missions landing sites by the orbiter, using multiple payloads. Six of the sites have been mapped, including the landing sites of Apollo 15 and Apollo 17.

=== Image acquisition ===
The craft completed 3,000 orbits acquiring 70,000 images of the lunar surface, which is quite a record compared to the lunar flights of other nations. ISRO officials estimated that if more than 40,000 images have been transmitted by Chandrayaan's cameras in 75 days, it worked out to nearly 535 images being sent daily. They were first transmitted to Indian Deep Space Network at Byalalu near Bangalore, from where they were flashed to ISRO's Telemetry Tracking And Command Network (ISTRAC) at Bangalore.

Some of these images have a resolution of down to 5 metres (16 ft), providing a sharp and clear picture of the Moon's surface, while many images sent by some of the other missions had a 100-metre resolution. For comparison, the Lunar Reconnaissance Orbiter Camera has a 0.5 metres (1 ft 8 in) resolution.

On 26 November, the Terrain Mapping Camera, which was first activated on 29 October 2008, acquired images of peaks and craters. This came as a surprise to ISRO officials because the Moon consists mostly of craters.

=== Detection of X-Ray signals ===
The X-ray signatures of aluminium, magnesium and silicon were picked up by the C1XS X-ray camera. The signals were picked up during a solar flare that caused an X-ray fluorescence phenomenon. The flare that caused the fluorescence was within the lowest C1XS sensitivity range.

=== Full Earth image ===
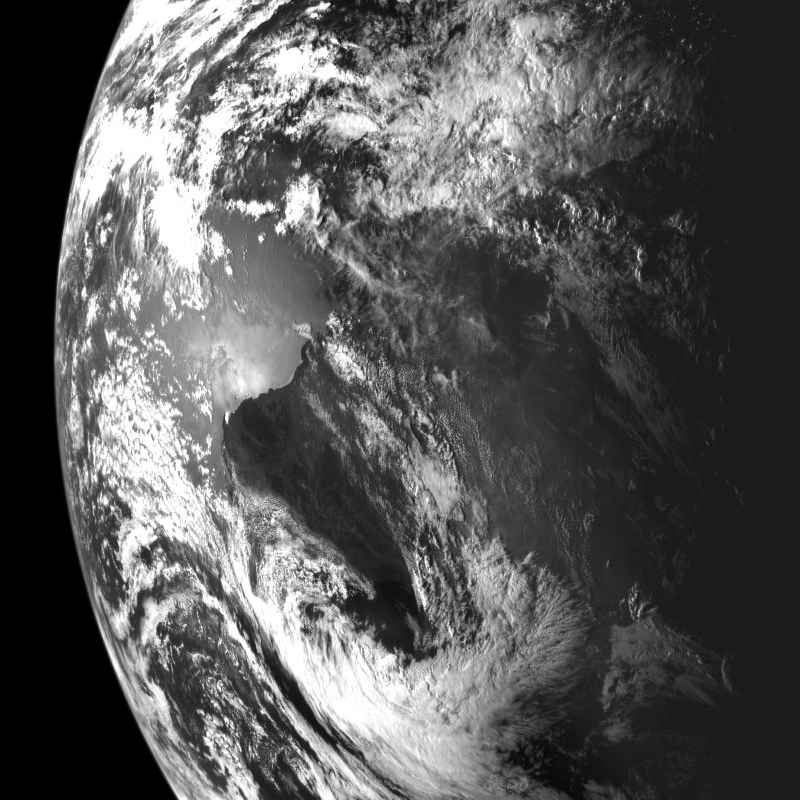
An image of the Earth taken by Chandrayaan-1

On 25 March 2009 Chandrayaan beamed back its first images of the Earth in its entirety. These images were taken with the TMC. Previous imaging was done on only one part of the Earth. The new images show Asia, parts of Africa and Australia with India being in the centre.

=== Orbit raised to 200 km ===
After the completion of all the major mission objectives, the orbit of Chandrayaan-1 spacecraft, which had been at a height of 100 km (62 mi) from the lunar surface since November 2008, was raised to 200 km (124 mi). The orbit-raising manoeuvres were carried out between 03:30 and 04:30 UTC on 19 May 2009. The spacecraft at this higher altitude enabled further studies on orbit perturbations and gravitational field variation of the Moon and also enabled imaging of the lunar surface with a wider swath. It was later revealed that the true reason for the orbit change was that it was an attempt to keep the temperature of the probe down. It was "...assumed that the temperature [of the spacecraft subsystems] at 100 km above the Moon's surface would be around 75 degrees Celsius. However, it was more than 75 degrees and problems started to surface. We had to raise the orbit to 200 km."

=== Attitude sensor failure ===
The star tracker, a device used for pointing attitude determination (orientation), failed in orbit after nine months of operation. Afterward, the orientation of Chandrayaan was determined using a back-up procedure using a two-axis Sun sensor and taking a bearing from an Earth station. This was used to update three-axis gyroscopes which enabled spacecraft operations. The second failure, detected on 16 May, was attributed to excessive radiation from the Sun.

=== Radar scans ===
On 21 August 2009 Chandrayaan-1 along with the Lunar Reconnaissance Orbiter attempted to perform a bistatic radar experiment using their Mini-SAR radars to detect the presence of water ice on the lunar surface. The attempt was a failure; it turned out the Chandrayaan-1 radar was not pointed at the Moon during the experiment.

The Mini-SAR has imaged many of the permanently shadowed regions that exist at both poles of the Moon. In March 2010, it was reported that the Mini-SAR on board the Chandrayaan-1 had discovered more than 40 permanently darkened craters near the Moon's north pole which are hypothesized to contain an estimated 600 million tonnes (590×10^{6} long tons; 660×10^{6} short tons) of water-ice. The radar's high CPR is not uniquely diagnostic of either roughness or ice; the science team must take into account the environment of the occurrences of high CPR signal to interpret its cause. The ice must be relatively pure and at least a couple of meters thick to give this signature. The estimated amount of water ice potentially present is comparable to the amount estimated from the previous mission of Lunar Prospector's neutron data.

Although the results are consistent with recent findings of other NASA instruments onboard Chandrayaan-1 (the Moon Mineralogy Mapper (MP3) discovered water molecules in the Moon's polar regions, while water vapour was detected by NASA's Lunar Crater Observation and Sensing Satellite, or LCROSS) this observation is not consistent with the presence of thick deposits of nearly pure water ice within a few meters of the lunar surface, but it does not rule out the presence of small (<~10 centimetres (3.9 in)), discrete pieces of ice mixed in with the regolith.

== End of the mission ==
The mission was expected to operate for two years. However, around 20:00 UTC on 28 August 2009 communication with the spacecraft was suddenly lost. The probe had operated for 312 days. The craft had been expected to remain in orbit for approximately another 1000 days and to crash into the lunar surface in late 2012, although in 2016 it was found to still be in orbit.

A member of the science advisory board of Chandrayaan-1 said that it is difficult to ascertain reasons for the loss of contact. ISRO Chairman G. Madhavan Nair said that due to very high radiation, power-supply units controlling both the computer systems on board failed, snapping the communication connectivity. However, information released later showed that the power supply supplied by MDI failed due to overheating.

Although the mission was less than 10 months in duration, and less than half the intended two years in length, a review by scientists termed the mission successful, as it had completed 95% of its primary objectives.

== Results ==
Chandrayaan's NASA Instrument Moon Mineralogy Mapper has confirmed the magma ocean hypothesis, meaning that the Moon was once completely molten. The terrain mapping camera (TMC) on board Chandrayaan-1, besides producing more than 70,000 three dimensional images, has recorded images of the landing site of U.S. spacecraft Apollo 15.

The TMC and HySI payloads of ISRO have covered about 70% of the lunar surface, while M^{3} covered more than 95% of the same and SIR-2 has provided high-resolution spectral data on the mineralogy of the Moon.

Indian Space Research Organisation said interesting data on lunar polar areas was provided by Lunar Laser Ranging Instrument (LLRI) and High Energy X-ray Spectrometer (HEX) of ISRO as well as Miniature Synthetic Aperture Radar (Mini-SAR) of the US.

The LLRI covered both the lunar poles and additional lunar regions of interest, HEX made about 200 orbits over the lunar poles and Mini-SAR provided complete coverage of both North and South Polar Regions of the Moon.

Another ESA payload – Chandrayaan-1 imaging X-ray Spectrometer (C1XS) – detected more than two dozen weak solar flares during the mission duration. The Bulgarian payload called Radiation Dose Monitor (RADOM) was activated on the day of the launch itself and worked until the mission's end.

ISRO said scientists from India and participating agencies expressed satisfaction on the performance of Chandrayaan-1 mission as well as the high quality of data sent by the spacecraft.

They have started formulating science plans based on the data sets obtained from the mission. It is expected that in the next few months, interesting results about lunar topography, mineral and chemical contents of the Moon and related aspects are expected to be published.

The Chandrayaan-1 payload has enabled scientists to study the interaction between the solar wind and a planetary body like the Moon without a magnetic field.

In its 10-month orbit around the Moon, Chandrayaan-1's X-ray Spectrometer (C1XS) detected titanium, confirmed the presence of calcium, and gathered the most accurate measurements yet of magnesium, aluminium and iron on the lunar surface.

=== Lunar water discovery ===
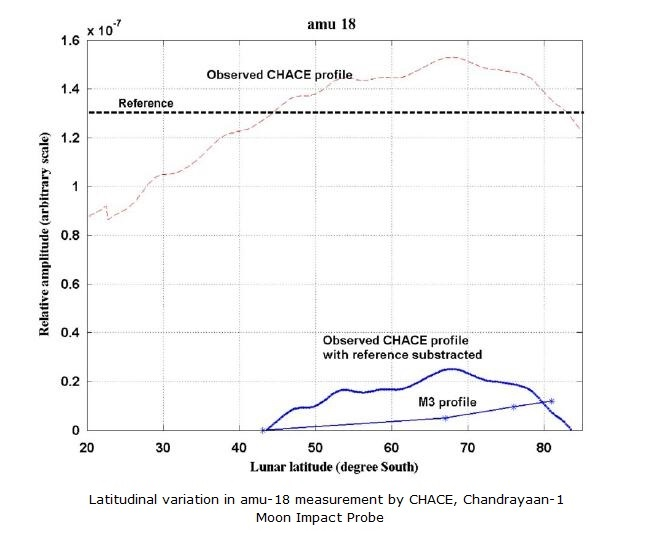
Direct evidence of lunar water through Chandrayaan-1 Chandra's Altitudinal Composition (CHACE) output profile

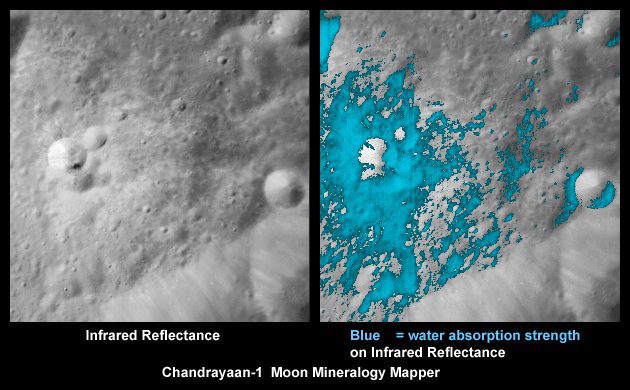
These images show a very young lunar crater on the side of the Moon that faces away from Earth, as viewed by Chandrayaan-1's NASA Moon Mineralogy Mapper equipment

On 18 November 2008, the Moon Impact Probe was released from Chandrayaan-1 at a height of 100 km (62 mi). During its 25 minute descent, Chandra's Altitudinal Composition Explorer (CHACE) recorded evidence of water in 650 mass spectra readings gathered during this time. On 24 September 2009 Science journal reported that the NASA Instrument Moon Mineralogy Mapper (M^{3}) on Chandrayaan-1 had detected water ice on the Moon. But, on 25 September 2009, ISRO announced that the MIP, another instrument on board Chandrayaan-1, had discovered water on the Moon just before impact and had discovered it 3 months before NASA's M^{3}. The announcement of this discovery was not made until NASA confirmed it.

M^{3} detected absorption features near 2.8–3.0 μm on the surface of the Moon. For silicate bodies, such features are typically attributed to hydroxyl- and/or water bearing materials. On the Moon, the feature is seen as a widely distributed absorption that appears strongest at cooler high latitudes and at several fresh feldspathic craters. The general lack of correlation of this feature in sunlit M^{3} data with neutron spectrometer H abundance data suggests that the formation and retention of OH and H_{2}O is an ongoing surficial process. OH/H_{2}O production processes may feed polar cold traps and make the lunar regolith a candidate source of volatiles for human exploration.

The Moon Mineralogy Mapper (M^{3}), an imaging spectrometer, came to a premature end on 28 August 2009. M^{3} was aimed at providing the first mineral map of the entire lunar surface. M^{3} data were reanalyzed years later and revealed "the most definitive proof to date" of the presence of water in shaded regions of craters near the Moon's north and south poles.

Lunar scientists had discussed the possibility of water repositories for decades. They are now increasingly "confident that the decades-long debate is over" a report says. "The Moon, in fact, has water in all sorts of places; not just locked up in minerals, but scattered throughout the broken-up surface, and, potentially, in blocks or sheets of ice at depth." The results from the Chandrayaan mission are also "offering a wide array of watery signals."

=== Lunar water production ===
According to European Space Agency (ESA) scientists, the lunar regolith (a loose collection of irregular dust grains making up the Moon's surface) absorbs hydrogen nuclei from the solar wind. Interaction between the hydrogen nuclei and oxygen present in the dust grains is expected to produce hydroxyl (HO^{−}) and water (H_{2}O).

The SARA (Sub keV Atom Reflecting Analyser) instrument developed by ESA and the Indian Space Research Organisation was designed and used to study the Moon's surface composition and solar-wind/surface interactions. SARA's results highlight a mystery: not every hydrogen nucleus is absorbed. One out of every five proton rebounds into space, combining with electron to form an atom of hydrogen. Hydrogen shoots off at speeds of around 200 kilometres per second (120 mi/s) and escapes without being deflected by the Moon's weak gravity. This knowledge provides timely advice for scientists who are readying ESA's BepiColombo mission to Mercury, as that spacecraft will carry two instruments similar to SARA.

=== Lunar caves ===
Chandrayaan-1 imaged a lunar rille, formed by an ancient lunar lava flow, with an uncollapsed segment indicating the presence of a lunar lava tube, a type of large cave below the lunar surface. The tunnel, which was discovered near the lunar equator, is an empty volcanic tube, measuring about 2 km (1.2 mi) in length and 360 m (1,180 ft) in width. According to A. S. Arya, scientist SF of Ahmedabad-based Space Application Centre (SAC), this could be a potential site for human settlement on the Moon. Earlier, Japanese Lunar orbiter SELENE (Kaguya) also recorded evidence for other caves on the Moon.

=== Tectonism ===
Data from the microwave sensor (Mini-SAR) of Chandrayaan-1 processed using the image analysis software ENVI, has revealed a good amount of past tectonic activity on the lunar surface. The researchers think that the faults and fractures discovered could be features of past interior tectonic activity coupled with meteorite impacts.

== Awards ==
- The American Institute of Aeronautics and Astronautics (AIAA) has selected ISRO's Chandrayaan-1 mission as one of the recipients of its annual AIAA SPACE 2009 awards, which recognises key contributions to space science and technology.
- The International Lunar Exploration Working Group awarded the Chandrayaan-1 team the International Co-operation Award in 2008 for accommodation and tests of the most international lunar payload ever (from 20 countries, including India, the European Space Agency of 17 countries, US, and Bulgaria).
- US-based National Space Society awarded ISRO the 2009 Space Pioneer Award in the science and engineering category, for the Chandrayaan-1 mission.

== Team ==
The main scientists of the Chandrayaan-1 project were:

- G. Madhavan Nair – chairman ISRO
- T. K. Alex – Director, ISAC (ISRO Satellite Centre)
- Mylswamy Annadurai – Project Director, Chandrayaan-1
- S. K. Shivkumar – Director – Telemetry, Tracking and Command Network
- M. Pitchaimani – Operations Director, Chandrayaan-1
- Leo Jackson John – Spacecraft Operations Manager, Chandrayaan-1
- K. Radhakrishnan – Director, VSSC
- George Koshy – Mission Director, PSLV-C11
- Srinivasa Hegde – Mission Director, Chandrayaan-1
- Jitendra Nath Goswami – Director of Physical Research Laboratory and principal scientific investigator of Chandrayaan-1
- Madhavan Chandradathan – Head, Launch Authorization Board, Chandrayaan-1

== Public release of data ==
Data gathered by Chandrayaan-I was made available to the public by the end of the year 2010. The data was split into two sections with the first section going public by the end of 2010 and the second going public by the middle of 2011. The data contained pictures of the Moon and also data of chemical and mineral mapping of the lunar surface.

== Follow-up missions ==
Chandrayaan-2 is a follow-up mission which was launched on 22 July 2019. The mission includes a lunar orbiter, a lander named Vikram and a robotic lunar rover named Pragyan. While a last-minute glitch in the landing guidance software resulted in the lander crashing, the Chandrayaan-2 orbiter is operational as of September 2023. A third mission, called Chandrayaan-3 was launched on 14 July 2023 and it successfully soft-landed on Moon on 23 August 2023

== Lunar outpost ==
Chandrayaan's imagery will be used to identify regions of interest that will be explored in detail by the NASA Lunar Reconnaissance Orbiter. The interest lies in identifying lunar water on the surface that can be exploited in setting up a future lunar outpost. The Mini-SAR, one of the U.S. payloads on Chandrayaan, was used to determine the presence of water ice.

== See also ==
- Exploration of the Moon
- Gaganyaan, India's crewed orbital spacecraft
- List of artificial objects on the Moon
- List of current and future lunar missions
- List of Indian satellites
- List of ISRO missions
- Lunar water
