= International Lunar Network =

Proposed set of robotic sensing stations on the Moon

The International Lunar Network or ILN was a proposed network of lunar surface stations to be built by the United States and the other space-faring countries in the 2010s. Each of these stations would act as a node in a lunar geophysical network. Ultimately this network could comprise 8-10 or more nodes operating simultaneously. Each node would have a minimum of two core capabilities. These capabilities include seismic sensing, heat flow sensing, and laser retroreflectors, and would be specific to each station. Because some nodes were planned to be located on the far side of the Moon, NASA would have contributed a communications relay satellite to the project. Individual nodes launched by different space agencies could have carried additional, unique experiments to study local or global lunar science. Such experiments might include atmospheric and dust instruments, plasma physics investigations, astronomical instruments, electromagnetic profiling of lunar regolith and crust, local geochemistry, and in-situ resource utilization demonstrations.

== History ==
On July 24, 2008 a meeting of the space agencies of Canada, France, Germany, India, Italy, Japan, the Republic of Korea, the United Kingdom, and the United States was held at NASA's Lunar Science Institute, located at the Ames Research Center. During the meeting, the representatives of the nine space agencies discussed about the cooperation on ILN and agreed on a statement of intent as a first step in planning. NASA's Science Mission Directorate (SMD) and Exploration Systems Mission Directorate (ESMD) agreed to provide two pairs of nodes (landed stations) for this network.

== Payload ==
The planned scientific payloads included:

- seismometers
- magnetometers
- laser retroreflectors
- subsoil thermal probes

== Status ==
The network was not developed. The first two nodes were suggested to be launched in 2013 and 2014, with the second pair being launched some time between 2016 and 2017.
