= Lunar module =

Lunar lander designed for human spaceflight

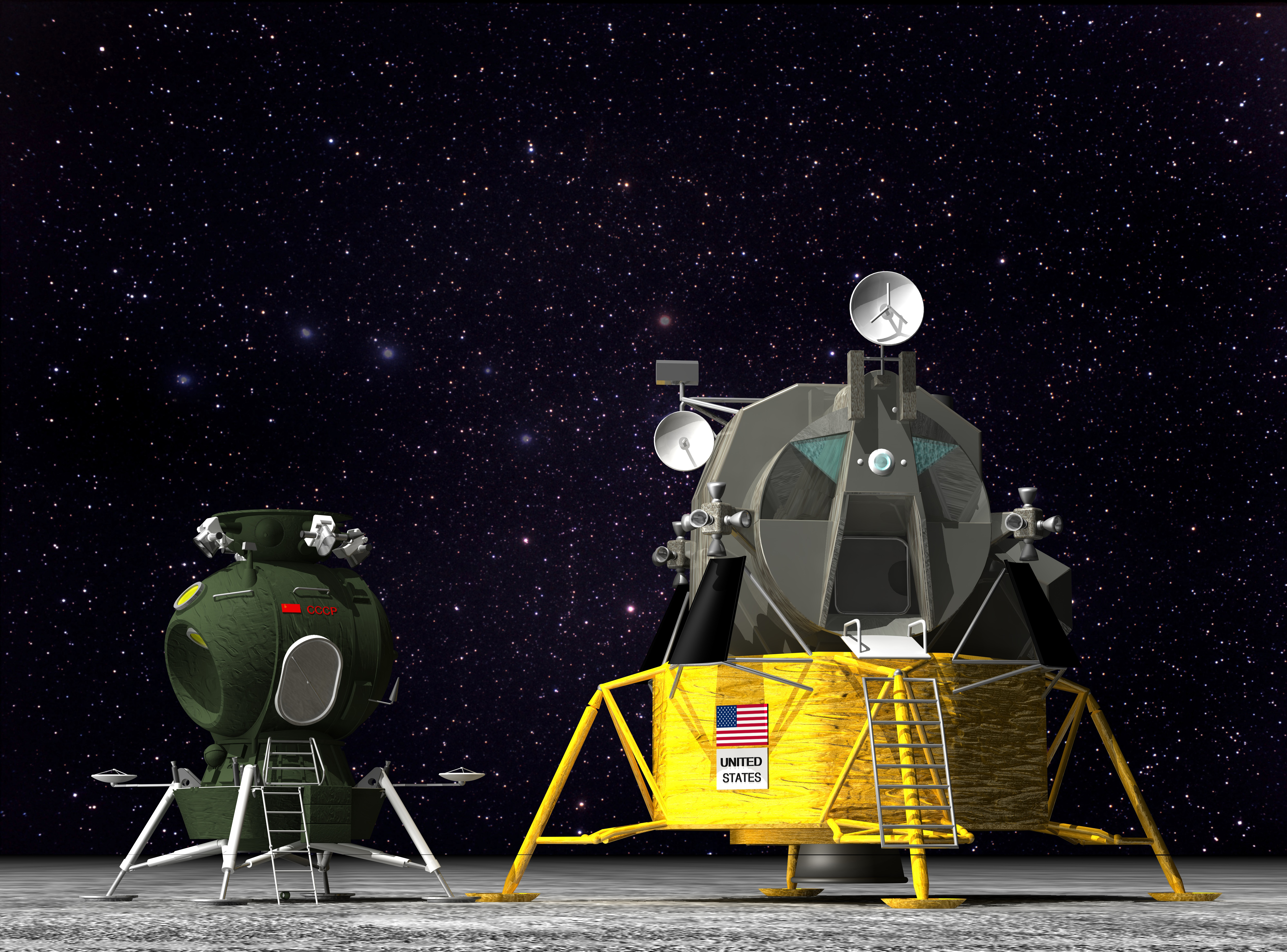
LK (left) and Apollo Lunar Module (right)

A lunar module is a lunar lander designed to allow astronauts to travel between a spacecraft in lunar orbit and the lunar surface. As of 2026, the Apollo Lunar Module is the only lunar module to have ever been used in human spaceflight, completing six lunar landings from 1969 to 1972 during the United States' Apollo program.

The LK lunar module was developed by the Soviet Union in the 1960s as a part of several Soviet crewed lunar programs. Several LK modules were flown without crew in low Earth orbit, but the LK lunar module never flew to the Moon, as the development of the N1 launch vehicle required for the lunar flight suffered setbacks (including several launch failures), and after the first crewed Moon landings were achieved by the United States, the Soviet Union cancelled both the N1 rocket and the LK lunar module programs without any further development.

== Proposed lunar modules ==
- Altair (spacecraft), a proposed lunar module for the Constellation program previously known as the Lunar Surface Access Module
- Human Landing System, a class of proposed lunar modules for NASA's Artemis program
  - Boeing Lunar Lander, proposed by Boeing
  - Blue Moon, proposed by Blue Origin
  - Lockheed Martin Lunar Lander, proposed by Lockheed Martin
  - Starship HLS, proposed by SpaceX
- Lanyue (formerly known as China crewed lunar surface lander) is a lunar module being developed by the China Academy of Space Technology
- Luna-Glob, a lunar exploration program by the Russian Federal Space Agency
- XEUS, a lunar module being developed by United Launch Alliance and Masten Space Systems

== See also ==
- Lunar lander
- List of crewed lunar lander designs
- Moon landing
- Moonbase
