= New Space Race =

Renewed 21st-century competition in space exploration

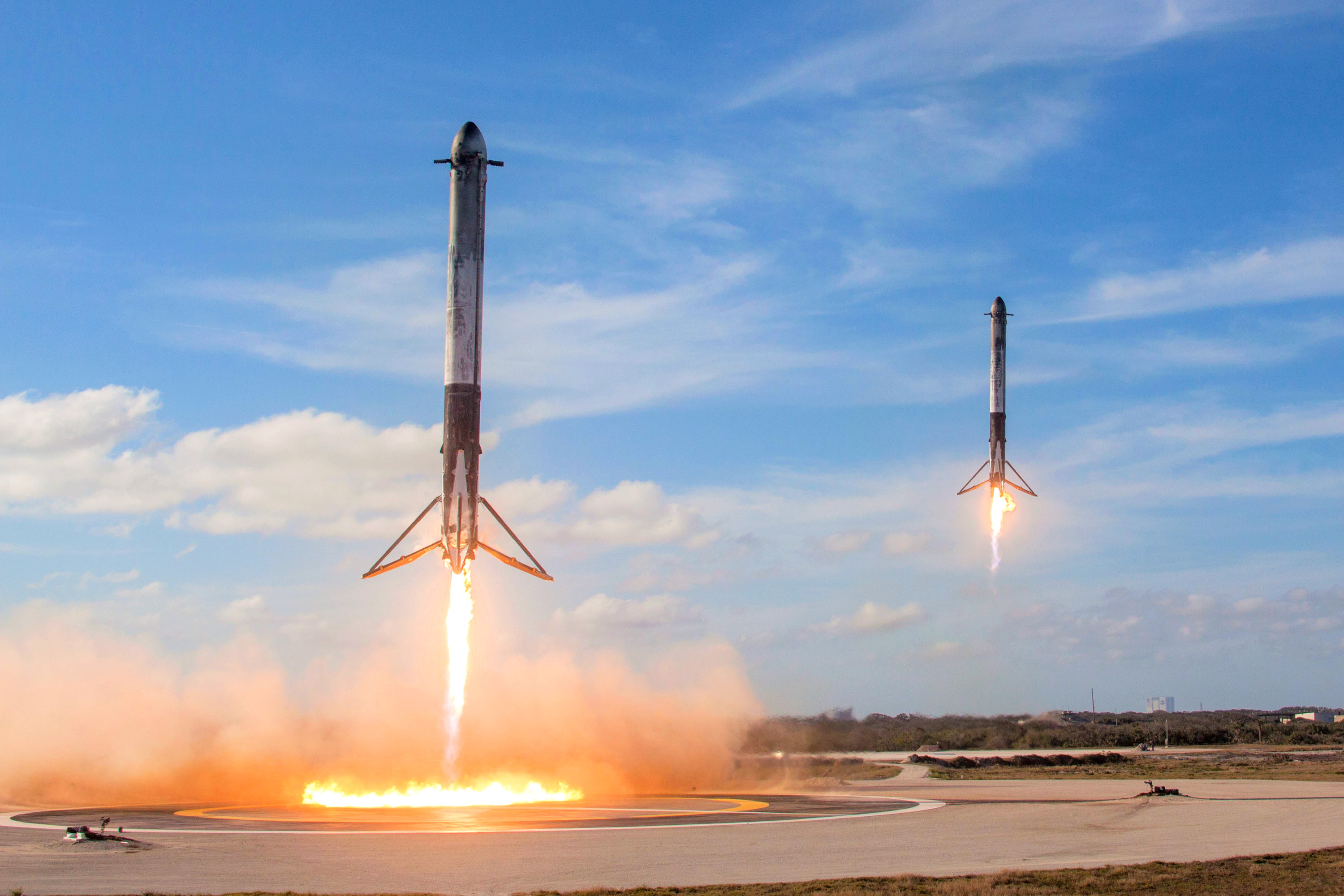
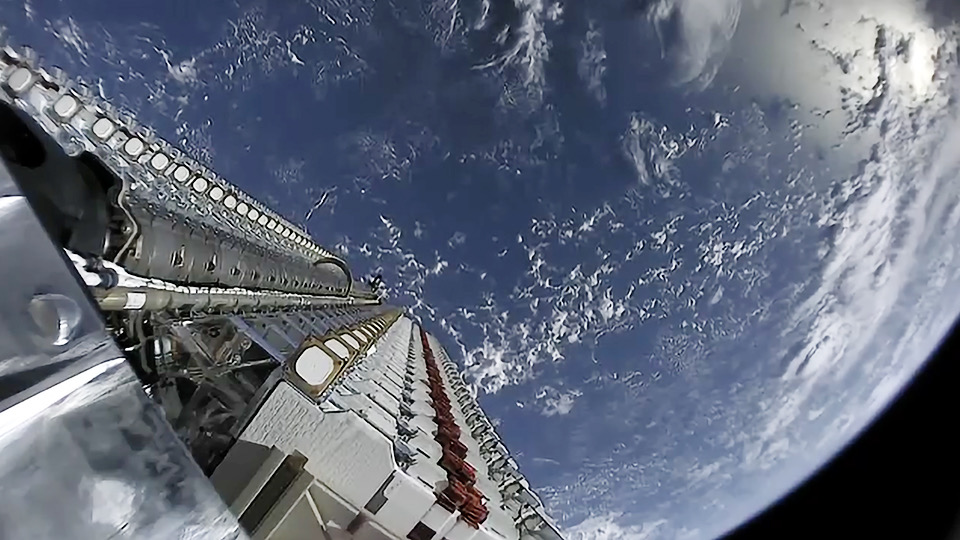
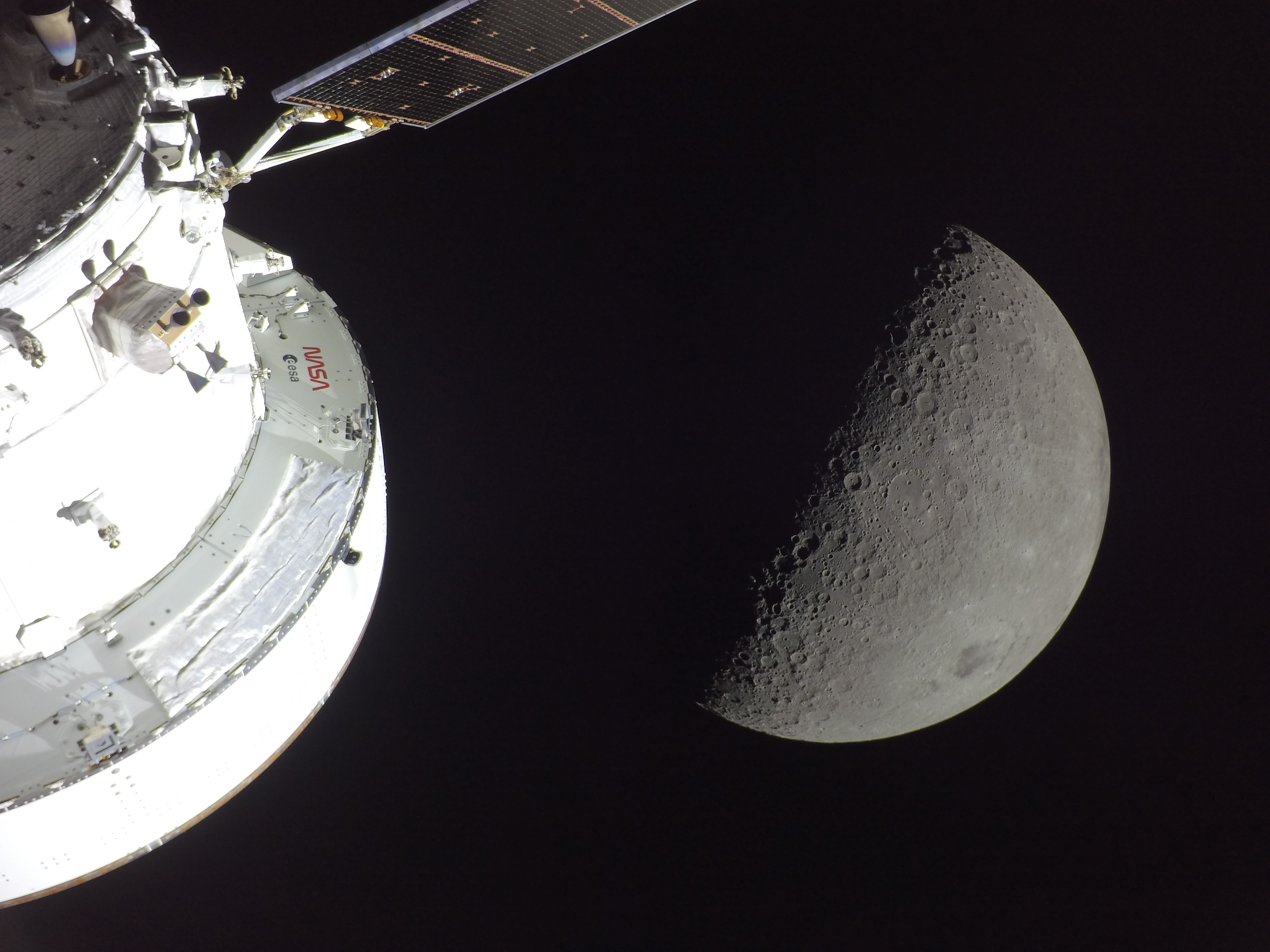
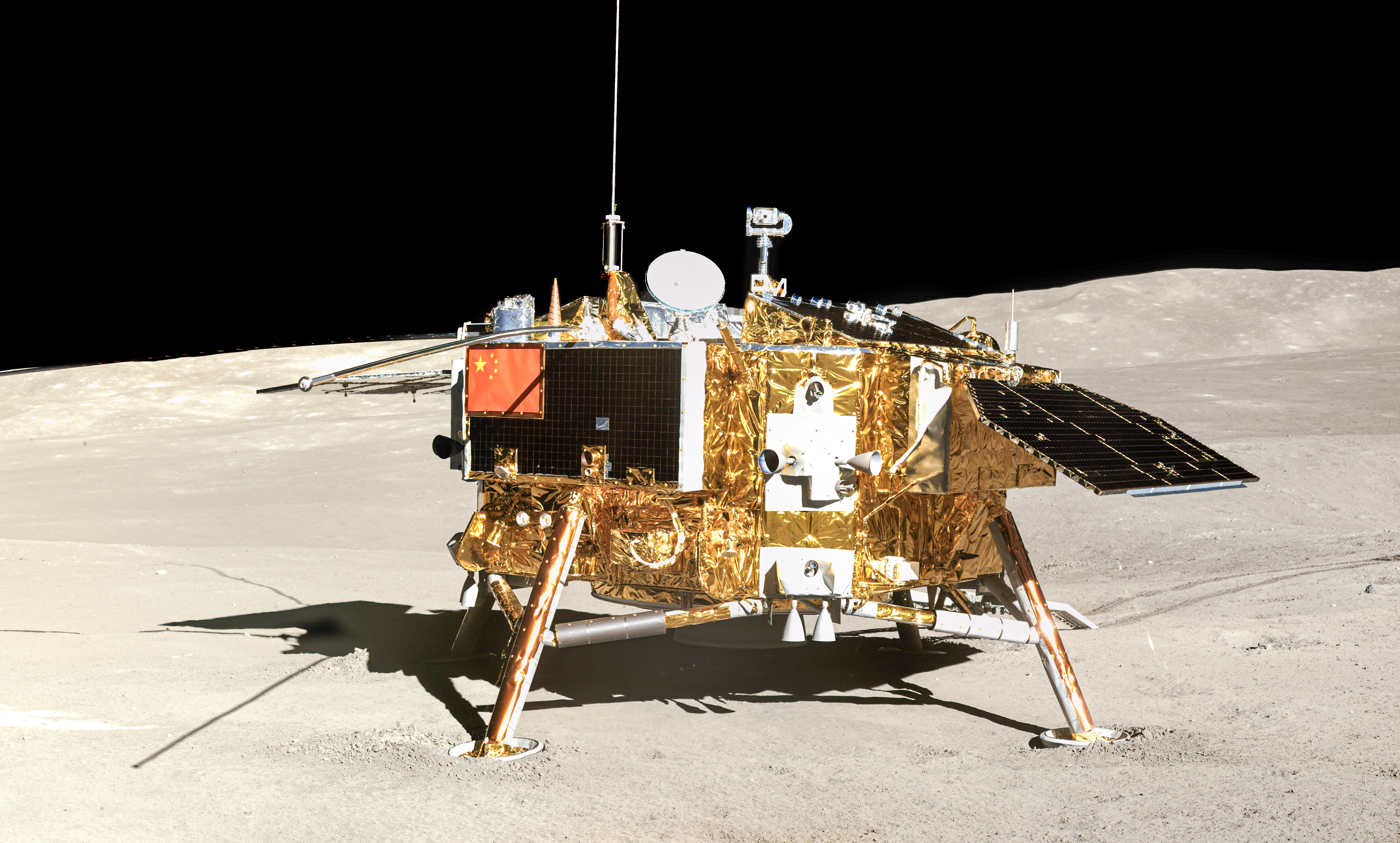
Clockwise from top left: Falcon Heavy boosters landing on their inaugural flight, 2018; First deployment of the Starlink satellite internet constellation, 2019; Chang'e 4 on the lunar surface, 2019; Artemis II approaching the Moon, 2026.

The New Space Race or Second Space Race describes the renewed competition in space exploration and technological development in the 21st century, primarily between the space programs of China and the United States, as well as other nations, and private spaceflight. This modern race is characterized by a broad range of objectives, including large satellite constellations, advancements in reusable launch vehicles and spacecraft, a return to crewed Moon landings, establishing a permanent moonbase, and crewed missions to Mars.

The Space Race was part of the Cold War, a rivalry between the US and the Soviet Union, and saw the realization of satellites, crewed Moon landings, space stations, and interplanetary spaceflight. In the 21st century, the China Manned Space Program saw its first crewed flight, two prototype space stations, and a continuously-occupied modular space station, Tiangong; the China National Space Administration sent orbiters, landers, and rovers to the Moon and to Mars. In the same period, NASA's human spaceflight centered on the International Space Station; crewed lunar hardware was consolidated under the Artemis program in 2017, centered on the Space Launch System and Orion spacecraft; long-term NASA probes explored the Martian surface, Jupiter, and Saturn. Humans returned to cislunar space during NASA's Artemis II flight in 2026, for the first time since 1972. The US currently targets a crewed lunar landing with Artemis IV in 2028. China plans a Long March 10-launched crewed lunar landing in 2029, and a robotic Mars sample return launch in 2028.

Some have argued that the New Space Race is part of a Second Cold War between China and the US. The New Space Race is seen as more multipolar than the original. The US-led Artemis Accords involve 68 nations, including space agencies of Europe, India, Japan, Canada, and the UAE. China and Russia's Roscosmos lead the International Lunar Research Station effort. Collaborations include ESA's Orion European Service Module, alongside other contributions made by five other space agencies in the cancelled NASA-led Lunar Gateway space station.

The concept also includes the "billionaire space race": increasing involvement of private aerospace companies, such as SpaceX, Blue Origin, and Virgin Galactic. These have transformed launch services via the Falcon 9, the satellite internet constellation market with Starlink, and space tourism via Dragon 2, New Shepard, and SpaceShipTwo.

== Participants and objectives ==
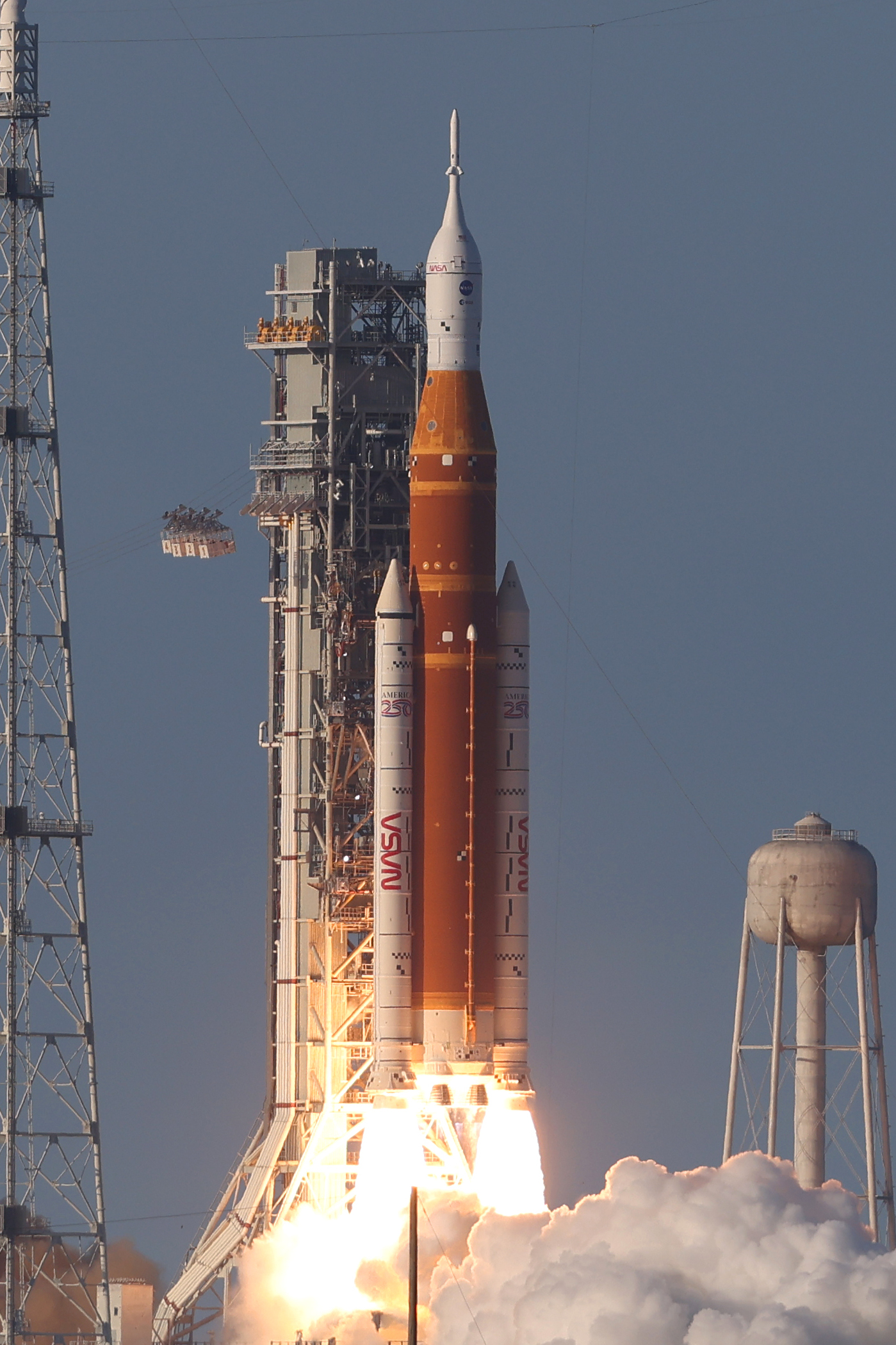
Space Launch System with the Orion spacecraft launching from Kennedy Space Center Launch Complex 39B for Artemis II

The primary race is between the government space agencies of the United States and China. The US uses its Artemis program and China uses its Chinese Lunar Exploration Program.

In the 2020s, both the US and China are engaged in an effort to establish a permanent presence on the Moon, with an emphasis on the lunar south pole. Further objectives include large satellite constellations, advancements in reusable launch vehicles and spacecraft, establishing a permanent a return to crewed Moon landings, and crewed missions to Mars.

Other nations, such as Russia, India, Japan, as well as European countries, are also active participants.

=== Summary table ===
This group of agencies have developed advanced technological capabilities required for travel and study of other heavenly bodies within the Solar System. These involve the capacity to leave the local area around the planet Earth for lunar and/or missions to other bodies in the Solar System.

Overview of space agencies extraterrestrial exploration capability
Space agency	Demonstrated capability					
Space agency	Operates flyby spacecraft	Operates extraterrestrial orbiter	Controlled surface impact	Uncrewed soft landing	Uncrewed rover operation	Sample return
(China) CNSA	Yes (Chang'e 5-T1)	Yes (Chang'e 1)	Yes (Chang'e 1)	Yes (Chang'e 3)	Yes (Yutu-1)	Yes (Chang'e 5)
ESA	Yes (Ulysses)	Yes (Mars Express)	Yes (Rosetta)	Yes (Huygens)	No	No
(India) ISRO	Yes (Chandrayaan-3)	Yes (Chandrayaan-1)	Yes (Moon Impact Probe)	Yes (Chandrayaan-3)	Yes (Pragyan)	No
(Japan) JAXA	Yes (Hiten)	Yes (Hiten)	Yes (Hiten)	Yes (Hayabusa)	Yes (MINERVA-II)	Yes (Hayabusa)
(Soviet Union) Soviet space program †	Yes (Luna 1)	Yes (Luna 10)	Yes (Luna 2)	Yes (Luna 9)	Yes (Lunokhod 1)	Yes (Luna 16)
(United States) NASA	Yes (Pioneer 4)	Yes (Lunar Orbiter 1)	Yes (Ranger 7)	Yes (Surveyor 1)	Yes (Sojourner)	Yes (Apollo 11)
(Russia) Roscosmos	No	Yes (ExoMars Trace Gas Orbiter)	Yes (Luna 25)	No	No	No

== Primary missions ==
=== Lunar missions ===
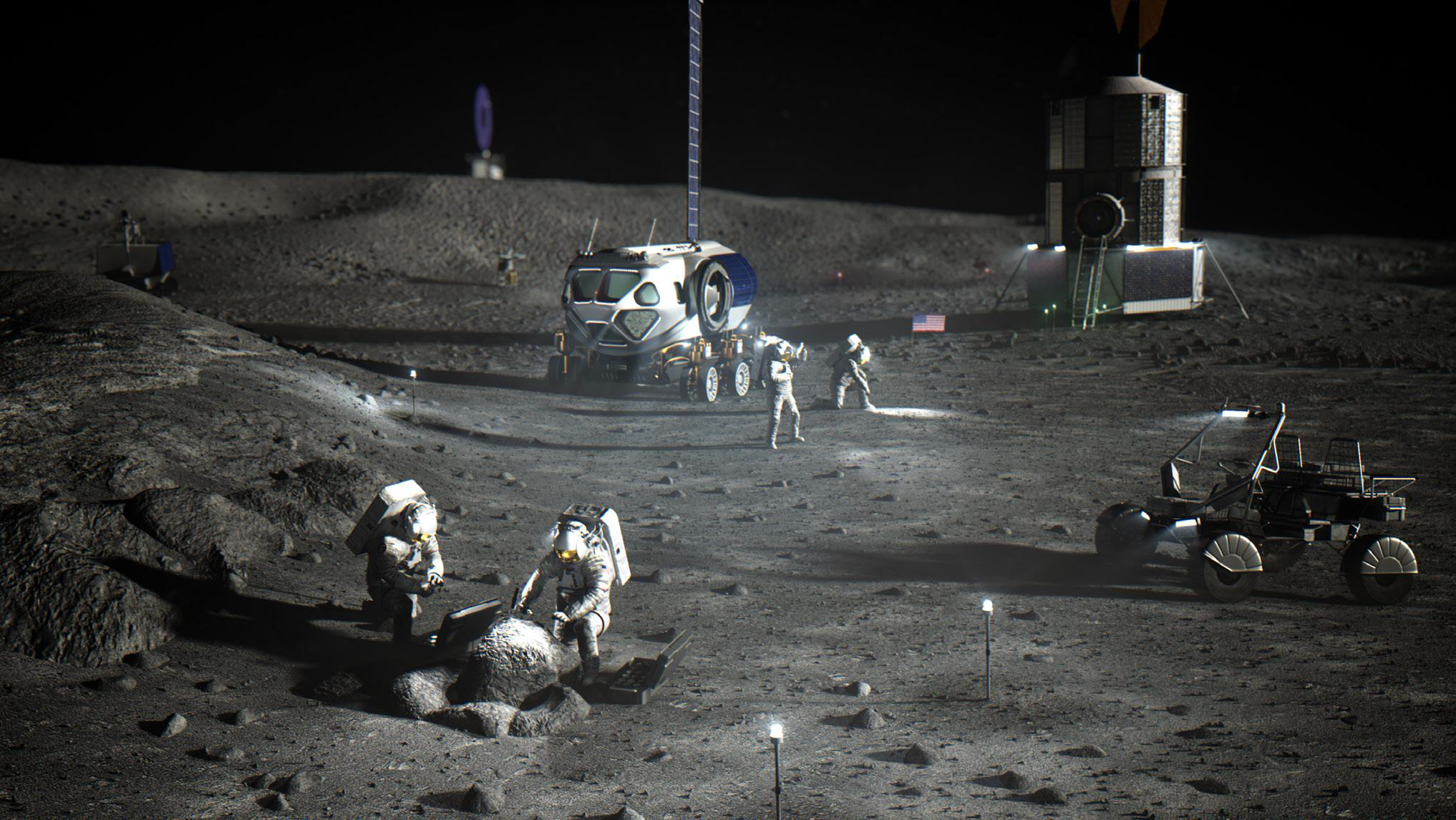
Concept art of Artemis Base Camp at the lunar south pole

Most missions associated with the New Space Race have focused on lunar exploration. A particular emphasis has been placed on the lunar south pole, where a large fraction of lunar water ice may be accessible. These missions are intended to demonstrate technologies and capabilities for sustained lunar exploration in preparation for the eventual establishment of permanent human outposts, as well as to serve as a proving ground and stepping stone for future crewed missions to Mars.

In 2019, China became the first country to achieve a soft landing on the far side of the Moon with Chang'e 4, which deployed Yutu-2, which remains operational as the longest-lived lunar rover ever. In 2024, China became the first country to return lunar samples from the far side of the Moon with Chang'e 6. China plans a Long March 10-launched crewed landing in 2029, likely late in the year.

In April 2026, NASA's Artemis II mission returned astronauts to the vicinity of the Moon for the first time since the Apollo program, including the first non-American to travel beyond low Earth orbit (Canadian astronaut Jeremy Hansen), and broke the record previously set by Apollo 13 for the farthest distance humans have ever traveled from Earth. The Artemis program's Human Landing System, either a Blue Moon Mark 2 or Starship HLS, will be selected following orbital testing during Artemis III in 2027, while Artemis IV is planned to land a crew on the surface in 2028.

India has already made significant progress with missions such as Chandrayaan-3, which successfully landed near the lunar south polar region on 23 August 2023, making it one of the few nations to achieve a soft landing on the Moon and the first to land near the lunar south pole.

=== Martian missions ===
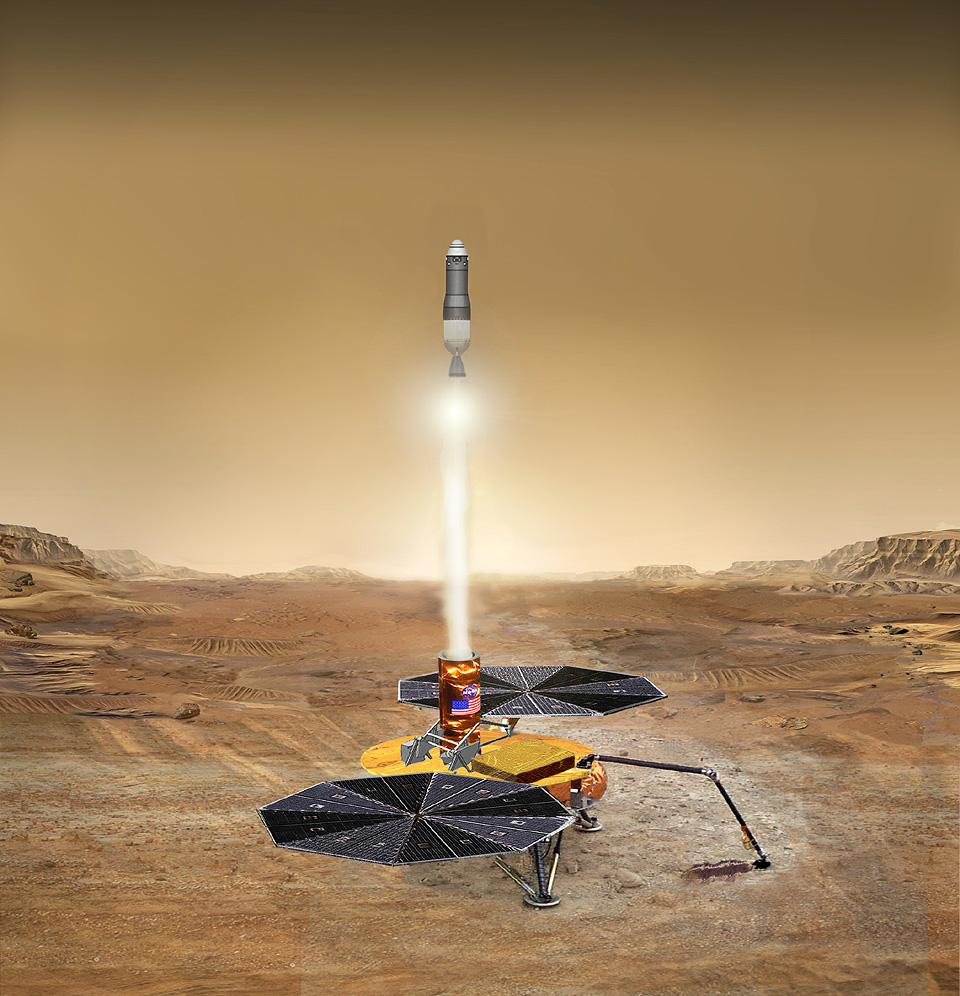
Launch concept of an interplanetary Mars sample-return mission

Mars remains a longer-term objective of the New Space Race. Unlike the Moon, Mars has not yet been visited by humans, and its greater distance makes crewed missions substantially more difficult. Robotic exploration has therefore continued to serve as a precursor to potential crewed missions.

In 2021, China became only the second country (after the United States) to successfully operate a lander and rover on Mars with Tianwen-1 and Zhurong.

Robotic Mars sample-return missions have been planned by China, as well as by NASA and the European Space Agency. However, as of August 2026, following US congressional budget cuts and ESA member proposals to cancel the Earth Return Orbiter (ERO)—a key element of the sample return—the joint mission is considered virtually cancelled.

=== Space stations ===
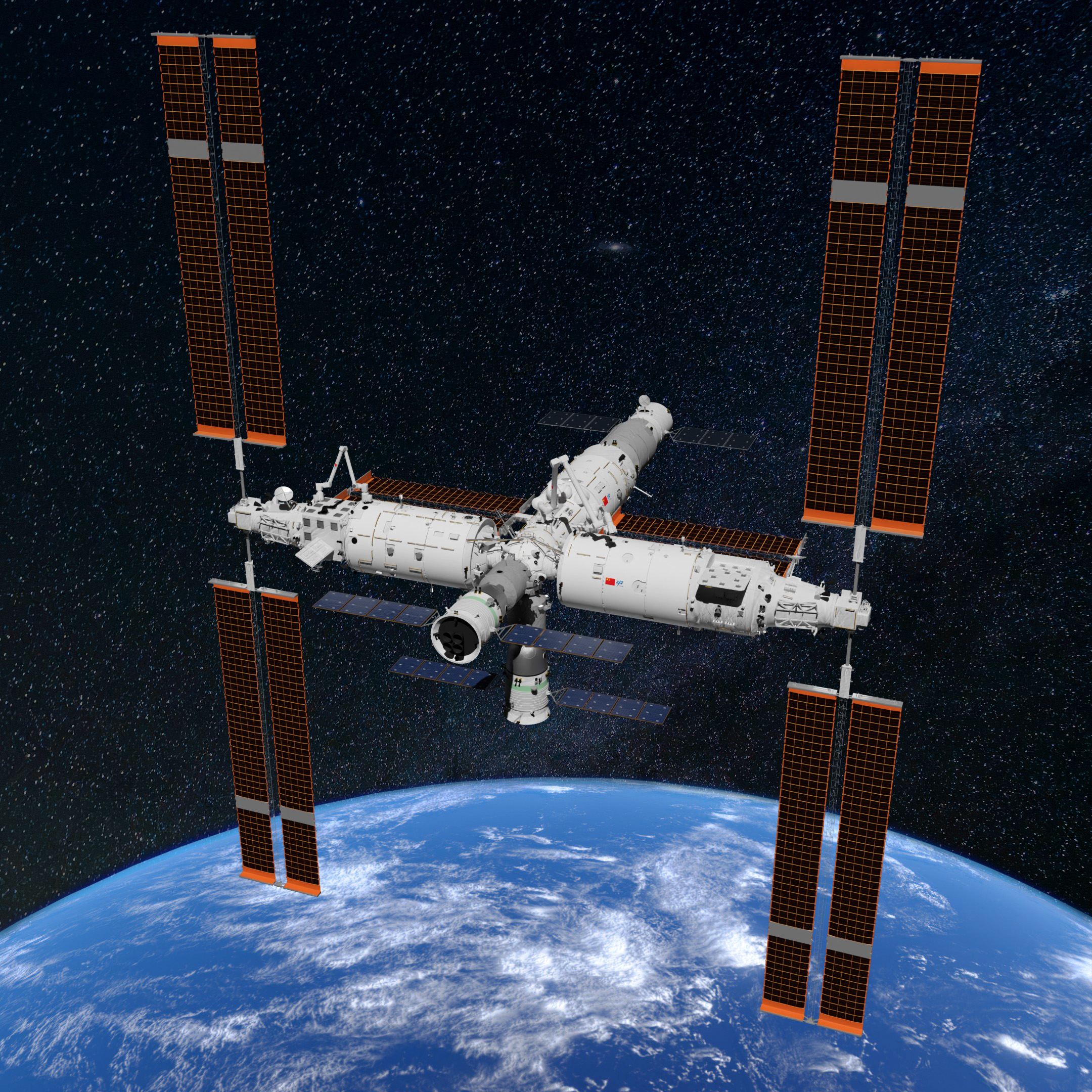
Rendering of China's Tiangong space station with a Tianzhou spacecraft docked aft and two Shenzhou spacecraft docked to the forward and nadir (Earth facing) ports

The New Space Race has also expanded into the development of space stations and commercial destinations in low Earth orbit.

Since 2021, China has operated Tiangong, the only space station in orbit alongside the International Space Station, and the third to use modular design following Mir and the ISS.

== Governance ==
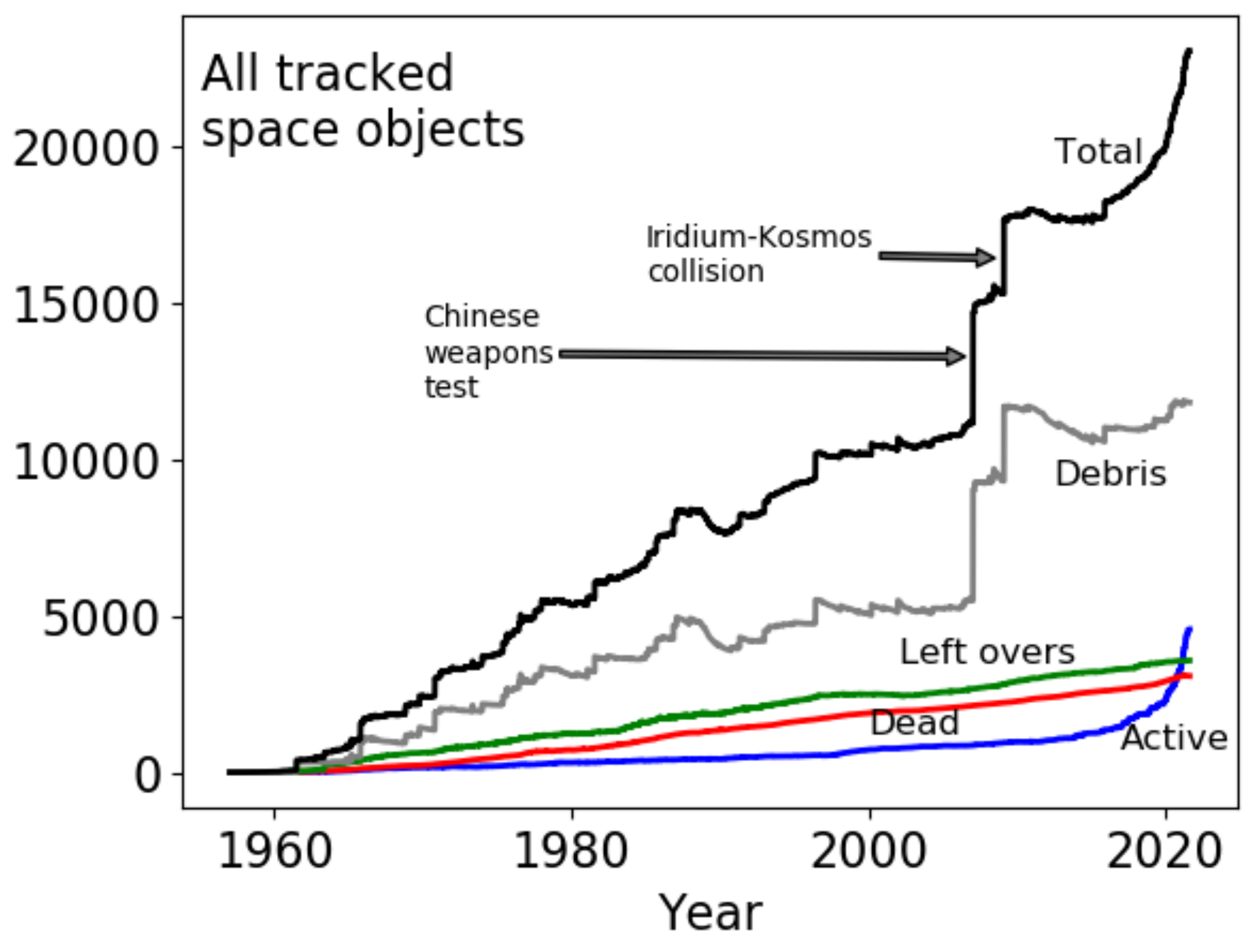
The growth of all tracked objects in space over time showing a recent increase of active satellites

Some have argued the New Space Race is a component of the Second Cold War concept, pointing to the alignment under the US-led Artemis Accords with Europe, India, and Japan, contrasted with the China and Russia-led International Lunar Research Station (ILRS). As of May 2026, 67 nations have joined the Artemis Accords, predominantly in the Global North and Latin America, while 13 nations have joined the ILRS, predominantly in the Global South. China and Russia initially hoped to attract major European states to the project, but the 2022 Russian invasion of Ukraine was seen as ending these efforts.

Some scholars have argued the substance of the Accords is "uncontentious" and represent a "significant political attempt to codify key principles of space law" for governing nations' space activities. China and Russia have criticized the Accords' framework for lunar mining as too favorable to US interests, with China describing them as "akin to European colonial enclosure land-taking methods."

== Private sector involvement ==
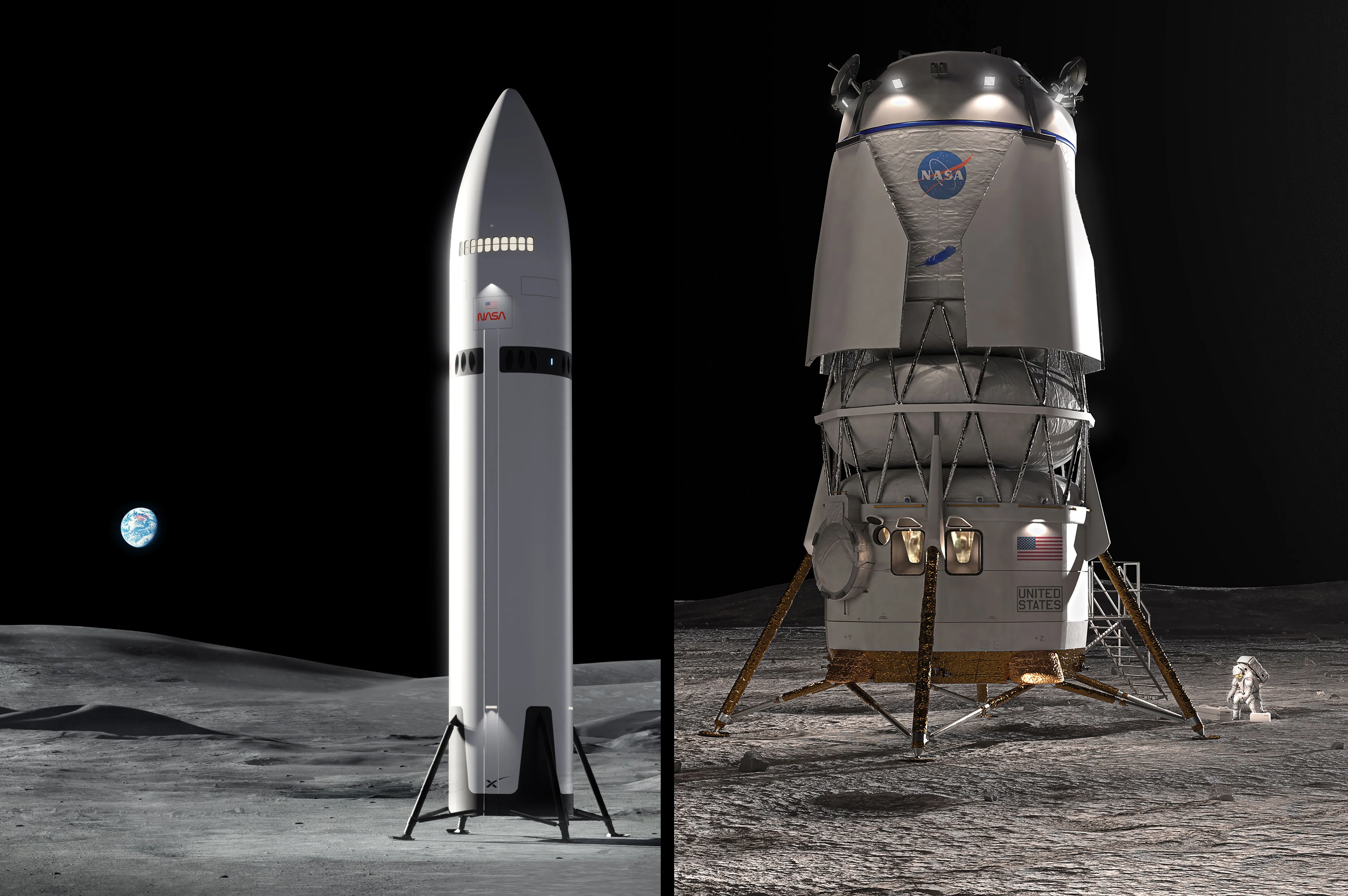
Renderings of the Human Landing System spacecraft: SpaceX's Starship HLS (left) and Blue Origin's Blue Moon Mark 2 (right)

Unlike the original Space Race during the Cold War era, private aerospace companies play a massive role in the New Space Race, with SpaceX and Blue Origin developing launch technology and services. This private spaceflight race involves sending privately developed rockets and vehicles to various destinations in space, often in response to government programs or even to develop the space tourism sector.

SpaceX's Falcon 9 has the most total launches of an active vehicle worldwide, its in-development Starship is the most powerful rocket flown, Starlink comprises 75% of active maneuverable satellites in orbit as of March 2026; Blue Origin's New Glenn is the most powerful reusable rocket to reach orbit.

In October 2025, NASA announced that it would reopen competition to develop its Human Landing System for the Artemis III mission, planning to use Space X's Starship HLS or Blue Origin's Blue Moon Mark 2, or both, depending on which was ready. NASA's acting administrator Sean Duffy said, "SpaceX has the contract to build the HLS which will get U.S. astronauts there on Artemis III. But, competition and innovation are the keys to our dominance in space so NASA is opening up HLS production to Blue Origin and other great American companies."

== See also ==
- Timeline of spaceflight
- Timeline of Solar System exploration
- Timeline of space exploration
- Human presence in space
