= List of crewed lunar landers =

This is a list of designs for crewed lunar landers, spacecraft intended to land on the Moon. A key aspect is achieving a soft landing, and for an ascent stage to successfully escape the Moon's gravity. Another aspect is how many stages the design has to undergo to achieve its objective, and the number of passengers and amount of payload it can carry.

| Name | Manufacturer | Operator (program and operational timeline) | Stages | Crew | Payload Mass | Status | Image |
|---|---|---|---|---|---|---|---|
| Altair | Northrop Grumman | NASA (Constellation, 2005–2009) | Descent, Ascent | 4 | 14,500 kg (32,000 lb) | Canceled | |
| Apollo Lunar Module | Grumman | NASA (Apollo, 1969–1972) | Descent, Ascent | 2 | | Retired | |
| Boeing Lunar Lander | Boeing | Boeing, NASA (Artemis, 2017–present) | Descent, Ascent | | | Rejected | |
| Dynetics HLS | Dynetics | Dynetics, NASA (Artemis, 2017–present) | Single-stage with drop tanks | 2-4 | | Rejected | |
| Blue Moon Mark 2 | Blue Origin, Lockheed Martin, Northrop Grumman, Draper Laboratory | Blue Origin, Lockheed Martin, Northrop Grumman, Draper Laboratory, NASA | Transfer, Lander/Ascent | 4 | | Planned | |
| Lanyue Lunar Lander | CAST | CMSA (CLEP) | Descent propulsion stage, Lander/Ascent | 2 | | Planned | |
| LK | RSC Energia/Yuzhnoye Design Office | Soviet Union (N1-L3, 1969–1974) | Descent, Ascent | 1 | | Canceled | |
| Lockheed Martin Lunar Lander | Lockheed Martin | Lockheed Martin, NASA (Artemis, 2017–present) | Single-stage | 4 | 1,000 kg (2,200 lb) | Rejected (elements incorporated into Blue Moon Mk 2) | |
| Starship | SpaceX | SpaceX | Single-stage | | | Planned | |
| Starship HLS | SpaceX | NASA (Artemis, 2017–present), SpaceX | Single-stage | 4 | 100–200 t (220,000–440,000 lb) | Planned | |
| BIS Lunar Lander | | British Interplanetary Society | Single-stage | 3 | | Studies (1939, 1947) | |
| Von Braun Lunar Lander | | US (1977) | Single-stage with drop tanks | 20 | 259 metric tons (with a crew of 10) | Study (1952) | |
| Horizon LERV | | US Army (Project Horizon, 1966) | Descent, Ascent | 10 - 16 | 2,700 - 22,000 kg | Study (1959) | |
| Lunex Lunar Lander | | US Air Force (Lunex Project, 1967) | Descent, Ascent | 3 | 20,500 kg | Study (1958–1961) | |
| Gemini lunar lander | | NASA Langley Research Center, (Project Gemini, 1963) | Single | 1 | | Canceled | |
| LEK | | Soviet Union, (Zvezda Moon base, 1974) | Descent, Ascent, Reentry | 3 | | Canceled | |
| FLO Eagle lander | | NASA (Space Exploration Initiative, 1992–93) | Descent, Ascent | 4 | 5,000 kg | Canceled | |

== See also ==
- Human spaceflight
- Lunar module – Lunar lander designed for human spaceflight
