= Human Landing System =

Lunar landers for the Artemis program

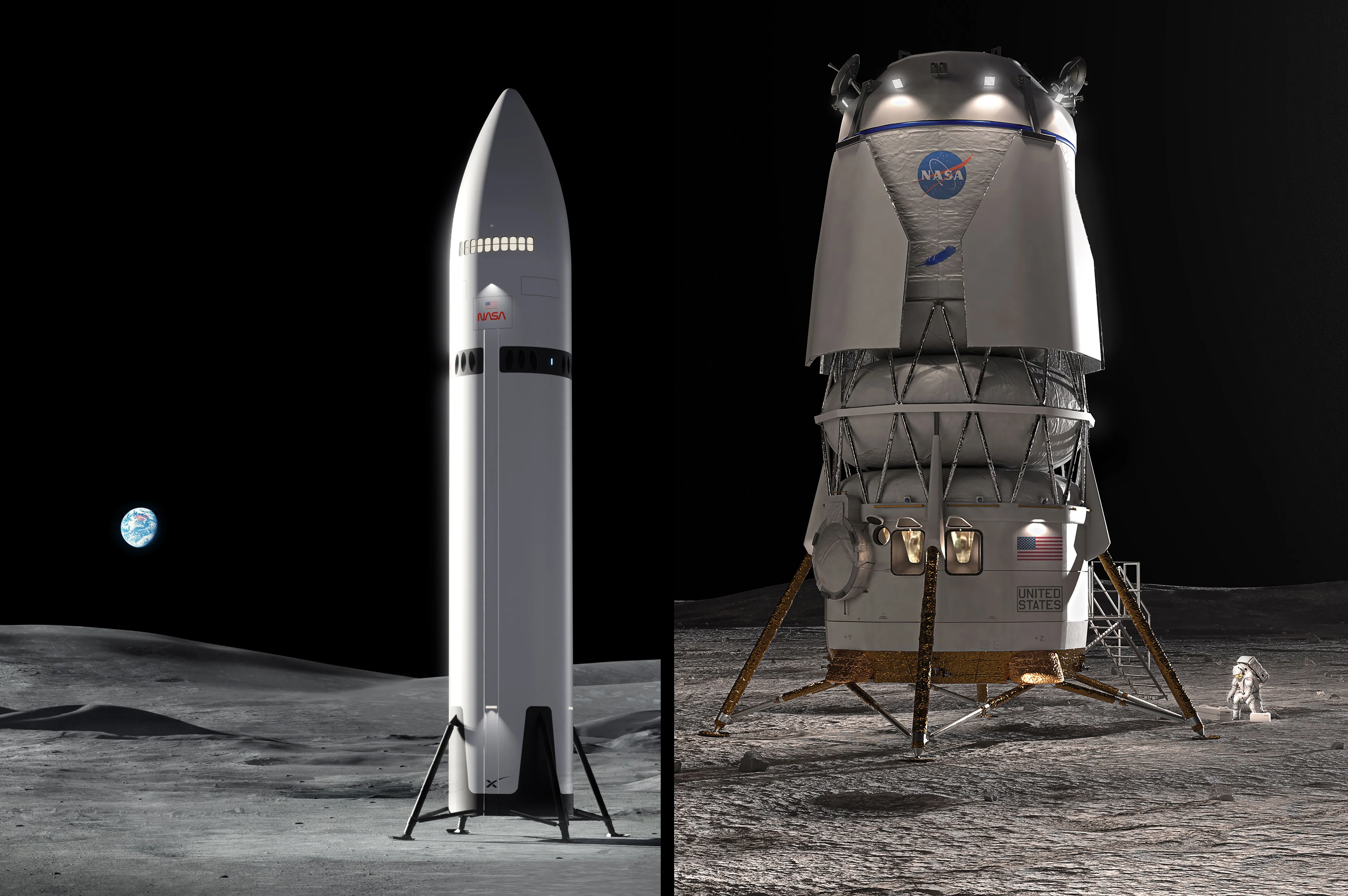
The two selected Human Landing System spacecraft: SpaceX's Starship HLS (left) and Blue Origin's Blue Moon Mark 2 (right).

The Human Landing System (HLS) are spacecraft developed for the NASA-led Artemis program to land astronauts on the Moon. HLS vehicles are designed to transport crews from lunar orbit to the lunar surface, support them during surface operations, and return them to lunar orbit. Two HLS designs are currently in development: SpaceX's Starship HLS and Blue Origin's Blue Moon Mark 2.

As of March 2026, NASA intends to launch one or both into Earth orbit in mid-2027 for rendezvous and docking tests as part of the Artemis III mission. Selection of the lander for the first crewed lunar landing of the program during the Artemis IV mission in early 2028 will depend on the results of those tests and equipment readiness.

Rather than leading development internally, NASA provided a reference design and solicited proposals from commercial vendors to design, develop, and deliver systems meeting agency requirements. The competition began in 2019, and Starship HLS was selected in 2021. Following the award, the procurement was challenged in court, alleging improper evaluation of proposals. In 2023, NASA expanded the program by selecting a second competing lander, Blue Moon, stating that the move would increase competition and support additional lunar landing opportunities.

== Reference design ==
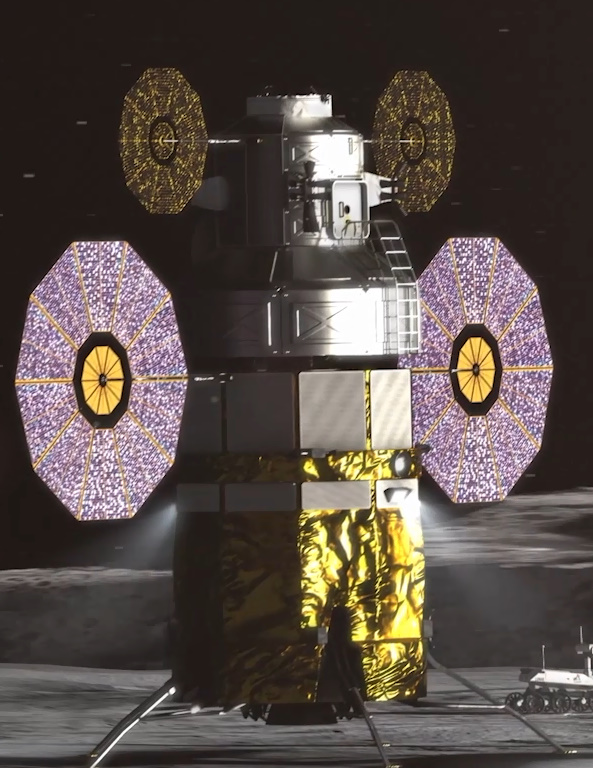
The Advanced Exploration Lander, the reference HLS design

The Advanced Exploration Lander was a 2018 NASA concept for a three-stage lander, intended to serve as a design reference for the commercial HLS design proposals. After departing from the Lunar Gateway in its lunar near-rectilinear halo orbit (NRHO), a transfer module would take the lander and embarked crew to a low lunar orbit and then separate. The descent module would then land itself and the ascent module carrying the crew on the lunar surface. A crew of up to four could spend up to two weeks on the surface before using the ascent module to take them back to Gateway. Each of the three modules would have a mass of approximately 12 to 15 metric tons and would be delivered separately by commercial launchers for integration at Gateway. Both the ascent and transfer modules could be designed to be reusable, with the descent module intended to be left on the lunar surface.

Lunar Gateway was cancelled in 2026.

== Preliminary HLS studies ==
In December 2018 NASA announced that it was issuing a formal request for proposals as Appendix E of NextSTEP-2 inviting American companies to submit bids for the design and development of new reusable systems allowing astronauts to land on the lunar surface. On February 14, 2019, NASA hosted an Industry Forum at NASA HQ to provide an overview of the Human Landing System (HLS) Broad Agency Announcement.

In April 2019 NASA announced a formal request for proposals closing on November 15, 2019, for Appendix H of NextSTEP-2 inviting American companies to submit bids for the design and development of the Ascent Element of the Human Landing System (HLS) including the cabin used during landings. This was extended to cover an option for an integrated lander—a single vehicle that performs transfer, descent, and ascent.

== Design competition ==
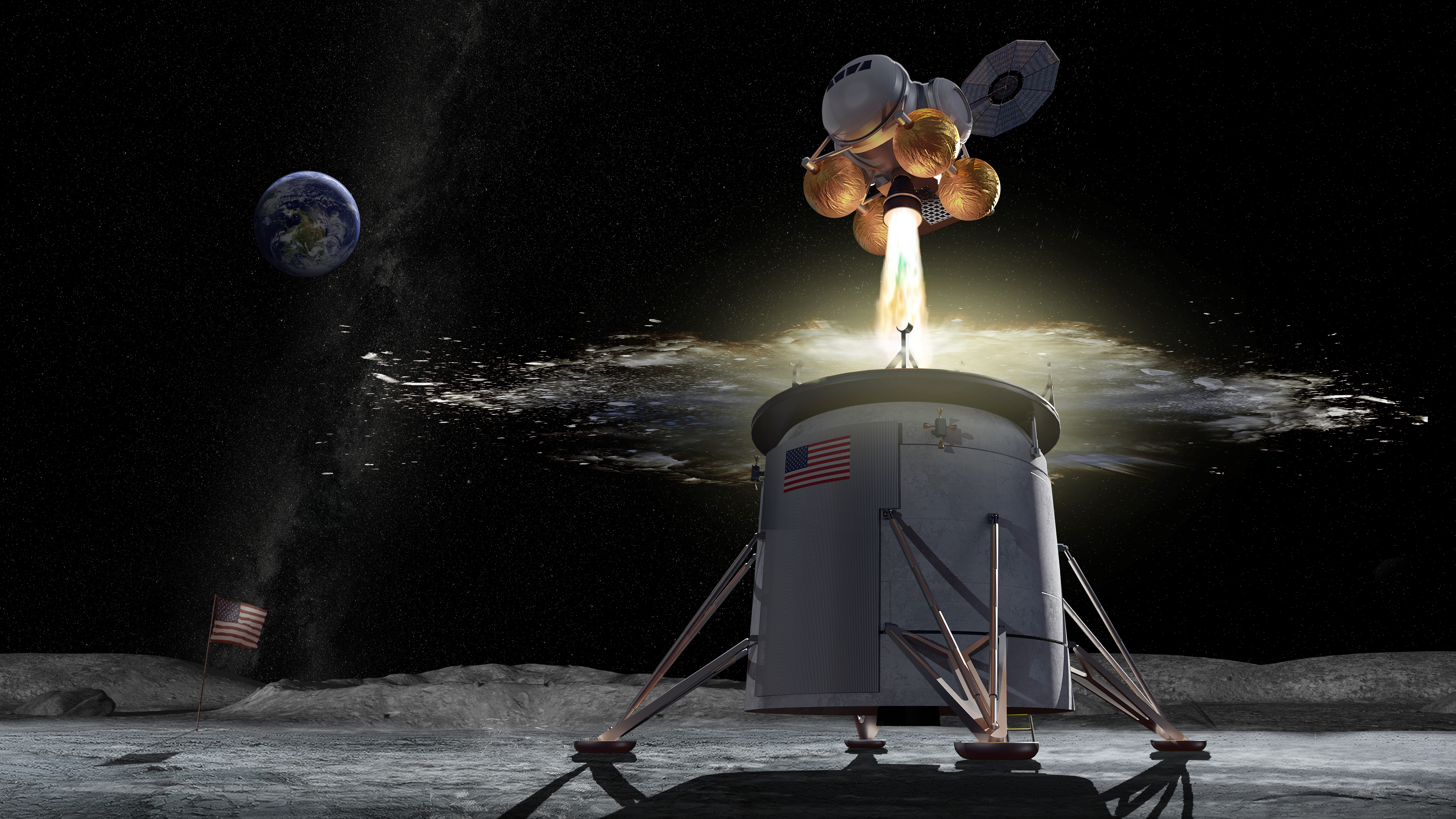
Artist's impression of Artemis program HLS ascending (2019)

Five companies responded to NASA's request for proposal by the November 2019 deadline, and after evaluating the proposals, NASA selected three for further design work. In April 2020, NASA awarded separate contracts totaling US$967 million in design development funding to Blue Origin, Dynetics, and SpaceX to begin a 10-month-long design processes. The companies/teams selected in the 2020 design awards were the "National Team" led by Blue Origin, (Note: the "National Team" was led by Blue Origin with partners Lockheed Martin, Northrop Grumman, and Draper) with US$579 million in NASA design funding; Dynetics, including SNC and other unspecified companies, with US$253 million in NASA funding; and SpaceX with a modified Starship spacecraft design called Starship HLS, with US$135 million in NASA design funding.

Although the HLS initial design phase was planned to be a ten-month program ending in February 2021 with the selection of up to two contractors, NASA delayed the selection process and announcement by two months.

The companies were bidding on a contract to provide design, development, build, test, and evaluation of an HLS, plus two lunar landings, one uncrewed and one crewed, for a fixed price. NASA evaluated the bids based on three evaluation factors: technical merit, managerial ability, and price, in that order, and found SpaceX better.

NASA evaluation
Company Factor	SpaceX	Blue Origin	Dynetics
Technical	Acceptable	Acceptable	Marginal
Management	Outstanding	Very good	Very good
Bid price US$ billion	2.94	5.99	9.08

On April 16, 2021, NASA selected only a single lander—Starship HLS—to move on to a full development contract. NASA awarded a US$2.89 billion contract to SpaceX to develop the Starship HLS lander and to provide two operational lunar missions—one uncrewed demonstration mission, and one crewed lunar landing—as early as 2025. NASA had stated that they would have preferred to award two contracts, but that insufficient funds were appropriated by Congress to allow the awarding of a second contract. This had been stated as a possible outcome in the contract solicitation.

Design and development contracts
Company	Vehicles	Contract award US$ million	
Company	Vehicles	Design	Develop
Boeing	The Boeing Lunar Lander concept consisted of a descent and ascent stage, to be launched on a Space Launch System rocket rather than assembled in multiple launches.	None	N/A
Vivace	A two-stage HLS concept.	None	N/A
National; Team	The Integrated Lander Vehicle (ILV), a three-element lunar lander concept (transfer, descent, and ascent elements) with each element intended to be launched via either Blue Origin's New Glenn or ULA's Vulcan Centaur and assembled in lunar orbit.	579	None
Dynetics	Dynetics HLS, an integrated single-stage system concept, intended to launch on either ULA's Vulcan Centaur or a Space Launch System rocket.	253	None
SpaceX	Starship HLS, single-stage lunar design variation of the SpaceX Starship spacecraft, launched by the Super Heavy booster and serving as its own second stage to reach low Earth orbit (LEO). Refueled by multiple Starship tanker spacecraft in LEO before boosting itself to lunar orbit to meet the Orion crew capsule. Moves between the lunar surface and lunar orbit as a single-stage-to-orbit.	135	2,890

== Post-competition protests and litigation ==
On April 30, 2021, both Blue Origin and Dynetics filed formal protests with the US Government Accountability Office claiming that NASA had improperly evaluated aspects of the proposals. On April 30, 2021, NASA suspended the Starship HLS contract and funding until such time as the GAO could issue a ruling on the protests. In May 2021, Sen. Cantwell, from Blue Origin's state of Washington, introduced an amendment to the "Endless Frontier Act" that directed NASA to reopen the HLS competition and select a second lander proposal and authorized spending of an additional US$10 billion. This funding would have required a separate appropriations act. Sen. Sanders criticized the amendment as a "multibillion dollar Bezos bailout", as the money would likely go to Blue Origin, which was founded by Jeff Bezos. The act, including this amendment, was passed by the U.S. Senate on June 8, 2021.

On July 30, 2021, the GAO rejected the protests and found that "NASA did not violate procurement law" in awarding the contract to SpaceX, who bid a much lower cost and more capable system. Nevertheless, CNBC reported on August 4 that "Jeff Bezos' space company remains on the offensive in criticizing NASA's decision to award Elon Musk's SpaceX with the sole contract to build a vehicle to land astronauts on the moon" and the company had produced an infographic highlighting several Starship deficiencies compared to the Blue Origin proposal, but noted the infographic avoided showing the Blue Origin bid price as roughly double the SpaceX bid price. Soon after the appeal was rejected, NASA made the contracted initial payment of US$300M to SpaceX.

On August 13, 2021, Blue Origin filed a lawsuit in the US Court of Federal Claims challenging "NASA's unlawful and improper evaluation of proposals." Blue Origin asked the court for an injunction to halt further spending by NASA on the existing contract with SpaceX. Reaction to the lawsuit was mostly negative in the space community, at NASA, and among Blue Origin employees according to space journalist Eric Berger. The judge dismissed the suit on November 4, 2021, and NASA was allowed to resume working with SpaceX.

== Starship HLS ==
The Starship Human Landing System (Starship HLS) was selected by NASA for long-duration crewed lunar landings as part of NASA's Artemis program.

The Starship HLS is a modified configuration of SpaceX's Starship spacecraft, optimized to operate on and around the Moon. As a result, the heat shield and flight control surfaces — parts of the main Starship design needed for atmospheric re-entry — are not included in Starship HLS. The entire spacecraft will land on the Moon and will then launch from the Moon. If needed, the variant will use high-thrust CH_{4}/O_{2} RCS thrusters located mid-body on Starship HLS during the final "tens of meters" of the terminal lunar descent and landing, and will be powered by a solar array located on its nose below the docking port. Elon Musk stated that Starship HLS would be able to deliver "potentially up to 200 tons" to the lunar surface.

Starship HLS would be launched to Earth orbit using the SpaceX Super Heavy booster, and would use a series of tanker spacecraft to refuel the Starship HLS vehicle in Earth orbit for lunar transit and lunar landing operations. Starship HLS would then act as its own transit vehicle to reach lunar orbit for rendezvous with Orion. In the mission concept, a NASA Orion spacecraft would carry a NASA crew to the lander, where they would depart and descend to the surface of the Moon. After lunar surface operations, Starship HLS would lift off from the lunar surface acting as a single-stage to orbit and return the crew to Orion.

NASA highlighted two weaknesses with SpaceX's proposal. Starship's propulsion systems were described as "notably complex", and the report referred to prior delays under the Commercial Crew program and Falcon Heavy launch vehicle development as evidence of potential threats to their development schedule.

== Blue Origin selected as second provider ==
In May 2023, Blue Origin was selected as a second provider for lunar lander services with a $3.4 billion contract. NASA stated that it decided to add another human landing system partner to: "increase competition, reduce costs to taxpayers, support a regular cadence of lunar landings, further invest in the lunar economy."

== Initial crewed Moon landing contract reopened ==
In October 2025, in response to mounting concerns over the timeline for development of Starship HLS, acting NASA administrator Sean Duffy announced the contract for a lander for the first Artemis Moon landing — at that time planned to be the Artemis III mission — was being opened up. Duffy expected Blue Origin to submit a proposal. As of April 2026, Blue Origin has not publicly announced details, but it had earlier been reported that while Blue Moon Mark 2 could likely not be delivered before the 2030s, Blue Origin had begun preliminary work on a crewed lander based on Blue Moon Mark 1, tentatively called Mark 1.5, which could be produced in time for the initial Moon landing. Under the revised Artemis timeline as of April 2026, one or both of Starship HLS and a Blue Moon lander will be tested in Earth orbit during the Artemis III mission.

== Unselected proposals ==
=== Integrated Lander Vehicle ===
The Integrated Lander Vehicle (ILV) or National Human Landing System (NHLS) was a lunar lander design concept proposed by the "National Team" led by Blue Origin, along with Lockheed Martin, Northrop Grumman, and Draper Laboratory as major partners.

The main selling point of the lander was that all the components had been in development in one form or another for some time. The transfer stage was based on the Cygnus spacecraft, the Blue Moon was to be used as the descent stage, and the ascent stage was based on the Orion spacecraft. It was to be launched in three parts on either the New Glenn and Vulcan Centaur but could also be launched on a single SLS Block 1B.

In the April 2020 HLS source selection statement, NASA stated that the vehicle passed all requirements but faced risks with its power, propulsion, and communications systems which posed a significant risk to the developmental timeline.

=== Dynetics ALPACA HLS ===
The Dynetics ALPACA (Autonomous Logistics Platform for All-Moon Cargo Access) Human Landing System design concept was proposed by Dynetics and Sierra Nevada Corporation with support from a number of subcontractors. The vehicle design consisted of a single-stage lander powered by methalox engines, although an earlier design used drop tanks. ALPACA was proposed to launch on a Vulcan Centaur or SLS Block 1B rocket, and be refueled by up to three Vulcan Centaur tanker flights. Ultimately, NASA did not select the proposal, citing negative mass margins and an experimental thrust structure, which could pose threat to development time.

=== Boeing HLS ===
The Boeing Human Landing System proposal was submitted to NASA in early November 2019. The primary solution was a two-stage lander designed to launch on a single SLS Block 1B, with Intuitive Machines working with Boeing to provide engines, and reusing technologies from their Starliner spacecraft. To cover the possibility that the SLS Block 1B was not ready by 2024, Boeing proposed a solution where the descent stage was launched on an SLS Block 1 while the ascent stage would be launched by a commercial launcher and assembled in lunar orbit. The Boeing proposal was not selected for design funding by NASA in the April 2020 design funding announcements.

=== Vivace HLS ===
The Vivace Human Landing System was a lunar landing concept by aerospace firm Vivace. Little is known about the vehicle other than its resemblance to NASA's Altair lunar lander from the Constellation program. Vivace's concept was not selected for full design funding.

== Alternative design studies ==
In addition to the design and development RFP for Appendix H of NextSTEP-2, NASA announced 11 contracts worth US$45.5 million in total for Appendix E of NextSTEP-2 in May 2019. These were short-term studies on transfer vehicles, descent elements, descent element prototypes, refueling element studies and prototypes. One of the requirements was that selected companies would contribute at least 20% of the total cost of the project "to reduce costs to taxpayers and encourage early private investments in the lunar economy".

A second set of contracts totaling $146 million was awarded on September 14, 2021. These contracts were for studies of a second-generation HLS that is to be used for missions after the initial crewed landing. As with the first set of contracts, NASA intends to award more than one HLS if there is sufficient funding.

On March 23, 2022, NASA announced it intended to initiate a formal request for proposals for second-generation HLS designs, drafting new sustainability rules to support it with a 2026–2027 delivery date for the design. NASA stated it would solicit designs from the broader aerospace industry out of a need for redundancy and competition. Under the current HLS contract, NASA also exercised an option calling for a second Starship HLS demonstration mission to the Moon, with the Starship design updated to meet the new sustainability rules. In addition, NASA announced a target date of April 2025 for Artemis III, likely using the first-generation Starship HLS design. Space.com journalist Mike Wall speculated that, based on statements from NASA Administrator Bill Nelson, NASA had gained enough congressional and presidential support to make the requests.

Additional studies
Date	Company	Amount US$ million	Contract
May; 2019	Aerojet Rocketdyne		One transfer vehicle study
May; 2019	Blue Origin		One descent element study, one transfer vehicle study, and one transfer vehicle prototype
May; 2019	Boeing		One descent element study, two descent element prototypes, one transfer vehicle study, one transfer vehicle prototype, one refueling element study, and one refueling element prototype
May; 2019	Dynetics		One descent element study and five descent element prototypes
May; 2019	Lockheed Martin Space Systems		One descent element study, four descent element prototypes, one transfer vehicle study, and one refueling element study
May; 2019	Masten Space Systems		One descent element prototype
May; 2019	Maxar (formerly SSL)		One refueling element study and one refueling element prototype
May; 2019	Northrop Grumman Innovation Systems		One descent element study, four descent element prototypes, one refueling element study, and one refueling element prototype
May; 2019	OrbitBeyond		Two refueling element prototypes
May; 2019	Sierra Nevada Corporation		One descent element study, one descent element prototype, one transfer vehicle study, one transfer vehicle prototype, and one refueling element study
May; 2019	SpaceX		One descent element study, one descent element prototype
September; 2021	Blue Origin	25.6	
September; 2021	Dynetics	40.8	
September; 2021	Lockheed Martin	35.2	
September; 2021	Northrop Grumman	34.8	
September; 2021	SpaceX	9.4	

== Follow-on programs ==
In 2021, NASA began studies on the future Lunar Exploration Transportation Services (LETS) for regular trips between the Gateway station, lunar orbits, and the lunar surface; for sustainable HLS operations.

== Related ==
- Lanyue, Chinese crewed lunar lander
