= Boeing Lunar Lander =

Abandoned lunar lander proposal

Boeing Human Landing System (HLS)
- A promotional render of the lunar lander
- Designer: Boeing
- Country of origin: US
- Applications: crewed lunar lander

Capacity

Payload to {{{to}}}

Production
- Status: Rejected
- Built: 0

The Boeing Human Landing System (HLS) was the name of a proposed lunar lander concept by Boeing that was submitted by Boeing to NASA on 5 November 2019 as part of the Artemis program and the NextSTEP H. The proposal was presented as the "quickest and simplest method" for a 2024 Moon landing. The lunar lander concept was not selected for funding by NASA as part of Artemis in the 30 April 2020 announcement.

== Overview ==
Boeing Human Landing System was a proposal for the design of a lunar lander and lunar orbit spacecraft that would use the Space Launch System (SLS rocket) being developed by NASA to launch the lander into Earth orbit and then place it in lunar orbit where it would rendezvous with the NASA Lunar Gateway and join up with a crew sent up in an Orion space capsule. This design concept was presented as a response to NASA's solicitation in May 2019, where about a dozen companies proposed lunar lander designs.

The Boeing lander consists of a descent and ascent stage with the descent stage being able to deorbit the lander, which eliminates the need for a third transfer stage. The lander was explicitly designed to be launched on the Boeing-built SLS Block 1B rocket rather than assembled in space after multiple launches, reducing the number of mission-critical events from 11 to 5, and reducing mission complexity. The lander was to be designed such that it would not have to dock onto the Lunar Gateway and could dock with Orion directly in order to allow for a simpler mission profile. The lander was intended to reuse several technologies from Boeing's CST-100 Starliner, so that the pressure vessel, life support and avionics systems could be flight-tested and human-rated before being integrated into the lander.

Intuitive Machines was selected to build and test the lander's engines and fuel tank structure. Aerojet Rocketdyne was also participating in the project.

== Challenges ==
One problem with the lander is its high launch mass which required it to be launched by a SLS Block 1B. This variant of SLS was not expected to be operational until 2025 at the earliest. It was stated that the lander could be launched in parts with the descent stage launching on SLS Block 1 and the ascent stage launching on a commercial launcher and the two parts be assembled in lunar orbit in case Block 1B is not ready.

== Investigation ==
The NASA inspector general launched an investigation after Boeing attempted to change the details of the submission, potentially indicating that Boeing had received information about other bids.

== Fate ==
It was reported by NASASpaceFlight.com in August 2021 that Boeing's VR-3500 engines developed for their lander were being cannibalized by Intuitive Machines for their future Nova-M lander.

== See also ==
- Dynetics Human Landing System
- Integrated Lander Vehicle
- Starship HLS
- Lockheed Martin Lunar Lander
- List of crewed lunar lander designs
