= Blue Moon (spacecraft) =

Lunar lander family for the Artemis program

Blue Moon (HLS/Mark 2)
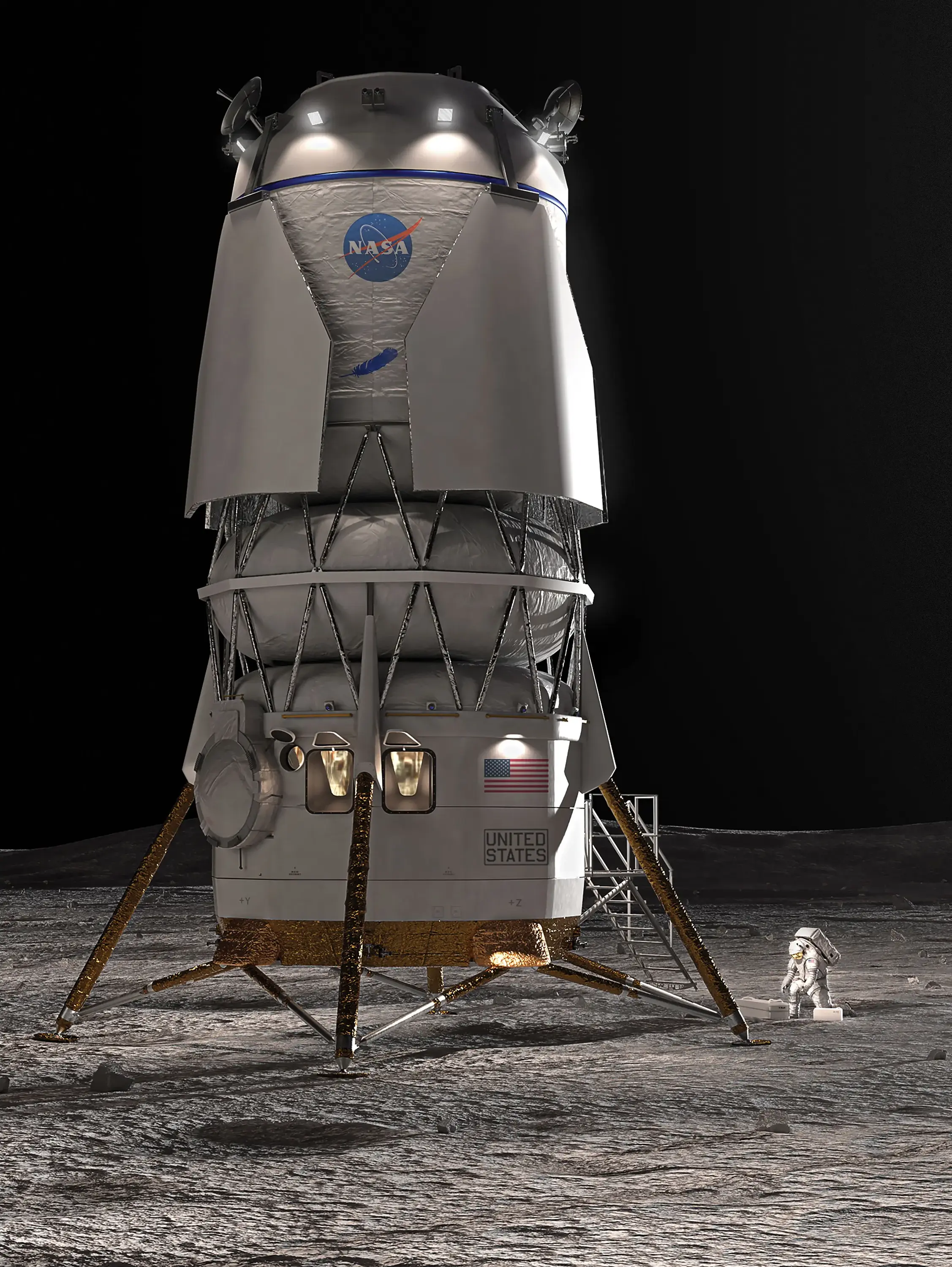
- Blue Origin Blue Moon HLS as selected by NASA.
- Manufacturer: Blue Origin
- Country of origin: United States
- Operator: NASA, Blue Origin
- Applications: Crewed and robotic reusable lunar landing

Specifications
- Spacecraft type: Lunar lander
- Launch mass: >45,000 kg (99,000 lb)
- Dry mass: 16,000 kg (35,000 lb)
- Payload capacity: 20,000 kg (44,000 lb) (cargo variant, reusable); 30,000 kg (66,000 lb) (cargo variant, one-way)
- Crew capacity: 4
- Regime: Lunar
- Design life: 30 days

Dimensions
- Height: 16 m (52 ft)

Production
- Status: In development

Blue Moon is a family of lunar landers and their associated infrastructure, intended to carry humans and cargo to the Moon, under development by a consortium led by Blue Origin and including Lockheed Martin, Draper, Boeing, Astrobotic, and Honeybee Robotics. Two versions of Blue Moon are under development: a robotic lander originally planned to land on the Moon in 2024 and delayed to 2026, and a larger human lander planned to land a crew of four astronauts on the lunar surface for NASA's Artemis program.

Development of the smaller, uncrewed lander (Mark 1) began in 2016 and was publicly revealed in 2017. It is planned to be capable of delivering up to 3.0 tonnes (3.3 short tons) of payload to the surface of the Moon. Originally envisioned as a way to gain experience with lunar landings and to support technology development, Mark 1 is also marketed independently of Mark 2. The lander has been proposed for a number of projected roles; an initial goal was a lunar south pole landing, where it was proposed that a series of landings could be used to deliver the infrastructure for a Moon base. Blue Moon formed the basis of part of the Integrated Lander Vehicle, a proposal for a human lander bid, but was not chosen for the Artemis HLS program.

The human lander, referred to as Mark 2, was chosen by NASA as the winner of the Sustaining Lunar Development Human Landing System contract in May 2023. It is the second human lunar lander under contract by NASA for the Artemis HLS program, alongside SpaceX Starship HLS. It is intended to carry up to 4 astronauts to the lunar surface for up to 30 days in a fully reusable configuration, with a cargo variant also planned. The lander is designed to be paired with a space tug called the Cislunar Transporter, to be built by Lockheed Martin. The Cislunar Transporter is launched in two parts, a tug and a tanker, to low Earth orbit before refueling Blue Moon in a lunar orbit. Both Mark 2 and the Cislunar Transporter are to be powered by three BE-7 engines burning liquid hydrogen fuel and liquid oxygen oxidizer. They are intended to make use of new cryogenic fluid management technologies under development, including those to enable long-term on-orbit storage of their cryogenic propellants.

== Description ==
Several spacecraft designs are included in the Blue Moon program. These include the Mark 1 lander, the Mark 2, and the Cislunar Transporter. Additionally, the BE-7 liquid rocket engine is under development and testing, and is intended to be used on each of these spacecraft.

=== Mark 1 ===
Blue Moon (Mark 1)
- Rendering of Blue Moon Mark 1
- Manufacturer: Blue Origin
- Country of origin: United States
- Operator: Blue Origin
- Applications: Robotic lunar landing

Specifications
- Spacecraft type: Lunar lander
- Launch mass: 21,350 kg (47,070 lb)
- Payload capacity: 3,000 kg (6,600 lb)

Dimensions
- Height: 8.05 m (26.4 ft)
- Diameter: 3.08 m (10.1 ft)

Production
- Status: In development

Blue Moon Mark 1, powered by a single BE-7 engine, is an autonomous lunar lander planned to be able to deliver and support cargo on the surface of the Moon. The Mark 1 spacecraft is 8.05 meters (26 ft 5 in) in height and 3.08 meters (10 ft 1 in) in diameter, with a fueled mass of 21,350 kilograms (47,070 lb). With a payload capacity reaching 3,000 kilograms (6,600 lb), uses suggested for Mark 1 include delivery of lunar rovers, as well as a "base station" that would serve as a power and communications outpost for lunar exploration. The flight computers, avionics, reaction control system, and power system of Mark 1 are to be in common with those used on Mark 2.

In September 2025, NASA tasked Blue Origin with a Commercial Lunar Payload Services study contract to show how a second Mark 1 lander could be used to deploy the VIPER rover on the lunar surface.

=== Mark 2-D ===
The Blue Moon Mark 2-D is an intermediary lander with a crew cabin, environmental control and life support systems, and reaction control systems, but without a main propulsion system. It will be used on Artemis III, where NASA astronauts will be able to enter the craft and test it in low earth orbit.

=== Mark 2 ===
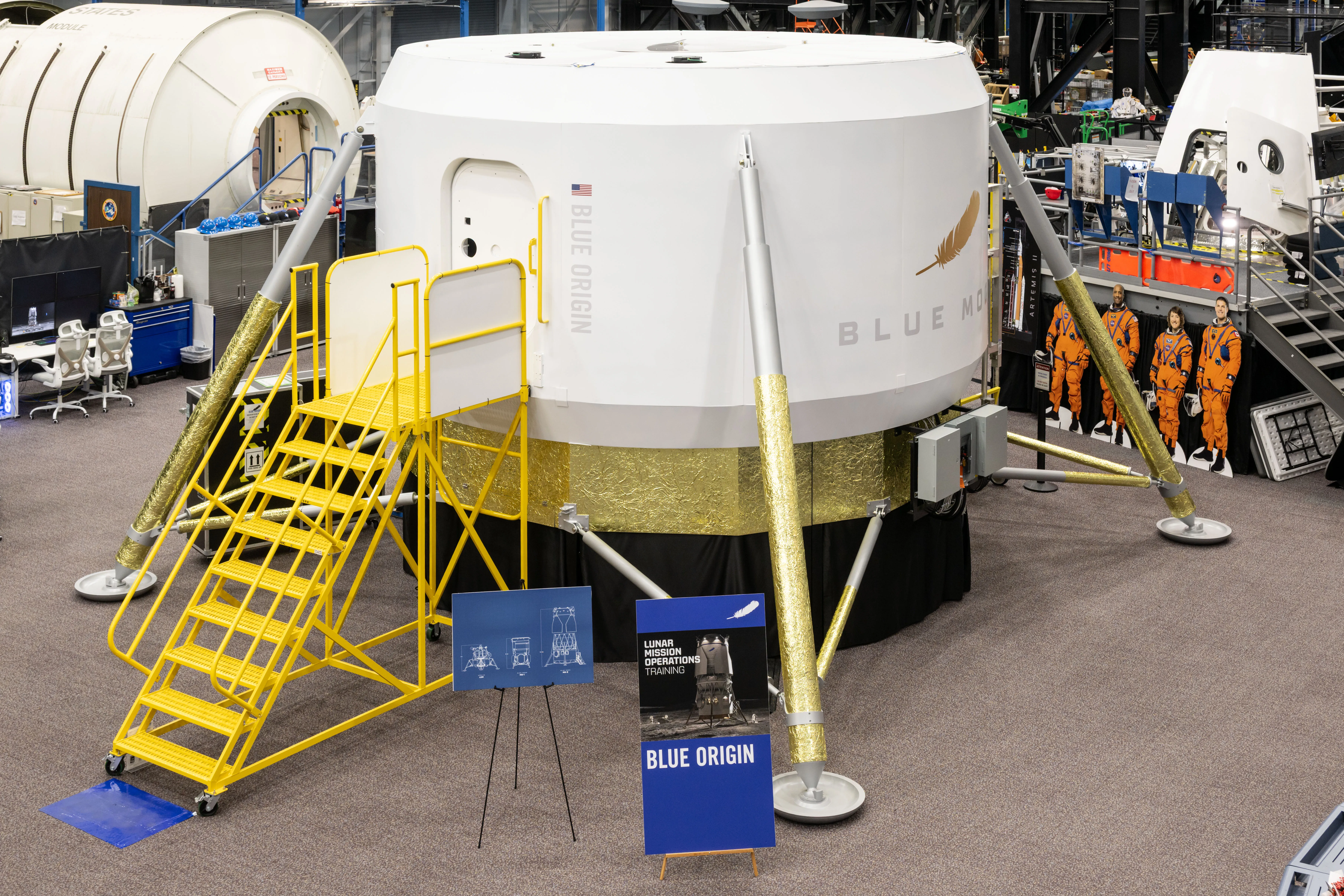
A full-scale prototype of the crew cabin of Blue Moon Mark 2 sitting at Johnson Space Center for training and testing in 2026.

The full-scale prototype of Blue Moon Mark 2 crew cabin was delivered to Johnson Space Center for training and testing in 2026.

Blue Moon Mark 2 is to carry two astronauts to the Moon, for up to 30 days at a time, starting with the Artemis V mission, set for 2030. The Blue Moon lander is to be capable of conducting crewed lunar landings lasting up to 30 days, pending an uncrewed demonstration flight scheduled for 2027. This uncrewed flight is to be a full demonstration of the HLS portion of the Artemis 5 mission, including the lander's life support systems, that would see the lander returning to lunar orbit after departing the lunar surface. A variant of the lander designed to carry cargo is also planned, capable of carrying a payload of up to 20,000 kilograms (44,000 lb) to the surface of the Moon in a reusable configuration or 30,000 kilograms (66,000 lb) in a one-way mission.

A technology critical for the operation of Blue Moon, being developed by Blue Origin, is a solar-powered propellant boiloff mitigation mechanism intended to enable long-term storage of liquid oxygen and liquid hydrogen at temperatures as low as 20 K (−253 °C; −424 °F). Such a system will enable the spacecraft to loiter in orbit or on the surface of the Moon, potentially allowing a permanent lunar presence or supporting nuclear thermal propulsion.

Blue Origin is to lead the development of the lander, which is designed to fit in the 7-meter (23 ft) payload fairing of the New Glenn launch vehicle in order to launch aboard the rocket. Astrobotic is to provide a cargo accommodation system for Blue Moon, to be used for large payloads such as surface habitats or lunar rovers. Boeing is to supply a docking system; Draper is to provide guidance, navigation, and control technology, and Honeybee Robotics will be responsible for supplying cargo delivery systems.

=== Cislunar Transporter ===
Lockheed Martin is to design and operate a reusable space tug called the Cislunar Transporter as part of the Blue Moon architecture. The Cislunar Transporter consists of two parts; a tug with three BE-7 engines, and a tanker. Each are to be launched on a New Glenn carrier rocket before docking together to form a single vehicle. After these components are assembled, the vehicle is then to be fueled by New Glenn upper stages transferring liquid oxygen and liquid hydrogen propellants. The transporter will then travel to lunar orbit, where it is to dock to and fuel the Blue Moon lander. Lockheed Martin has suggested that the Cislunar Transporter could also be used to service other customers. The same zero-boil-off system intended for Blue Moon will also be present on the Transporter.

=== BE-7 ===
Both variants of Blue Moon, as well as the Cislunar Transporter, are to be powered by the BE-7 liquid oxygen/liquid hydrogen engine currently under development. Mark 1 is to use a single engine, whereas the other spacecraft are to each use three. The BE-7 burns its propellants, chosen in part because they can be produced on the surface of the Moon from lunar ice, in the dual expander cycle, wherein each propellant flows through the engine, gaining heat energy, which is then used to spin turbines, providing energy to pump propellant into the combustion chamber. The BE-7 engine is designed to produce a maximum of 44 kN (10,000 lbf) of thrust and to throttle down to produce as little as 8.9 kN (2,000 lbf) of thrust. In addition to this "deep throttle" capability, it is also meant to be highly efficient, with high specific impulse, and to be capable of restarting multiple times. The BE-7 is additively manufactured, with components such as the injector being additively manufactured in a single piece. The regeneratively-cooled nozzle is composed of a nickel super-alloy jacket, vacuum-brazed onto a copper liner, and hydraulically formed into the nozzle's bell shape.

== History ==
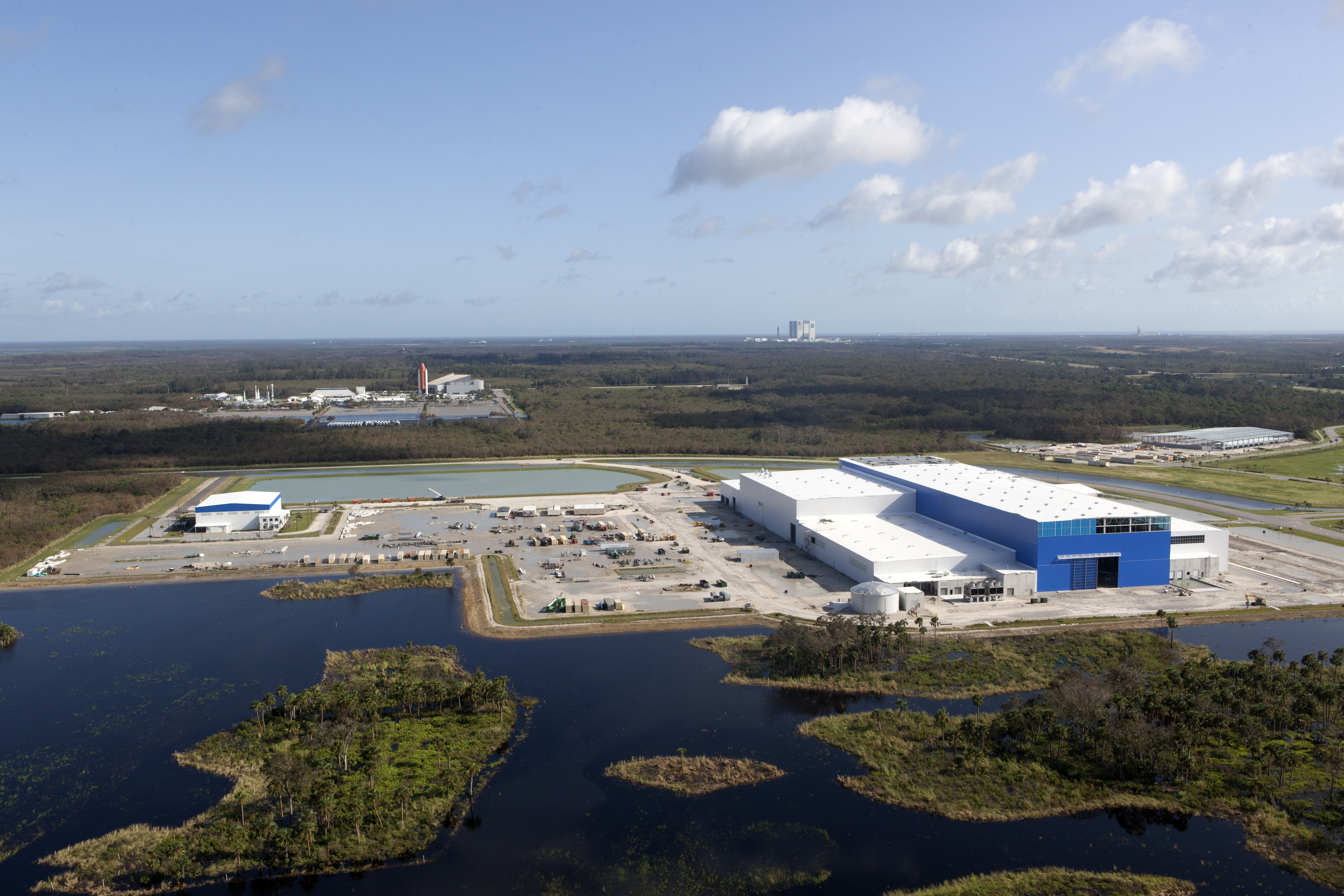
The Blue Origin construction site at Exploration Park in Florida on September 12, 2017.

=== Robotic spacecraft ===
Design work on a Blue Origin robotic lunar lander began in 2016. The lander platform was first publicly revealed in March 2017, featuring a lunar-surface-delivered payload capacity of 4,500 kg (10,000 lb). At that time, the first lunar landing mission was projected to take place in 2020. In April 2017, Blue Origin president Rob Meyerson stated that the lander could be launched by multiple launch vehicles, including Blue Origin's New Glenn, Atlas V, NASA's Space Launch System, or the Vulcan launch vehicle. In a May 2018 interview, Blue Origin's CEO Jeff Bezos indicated that Blue Origin would build Blue Moon on its own, with private funding, but that the project's pace would increase should a governmental space agency partner with the company. Bezos mentioned Space Directive 1, which oriented NASA towards pursuing lunar missions, and his support for the Moon Village concept, "a proposal promoted by European Space Agency head Jan Woerner for cooperation among countries and companies to cooperate... on lunar capabilities".

In May 2019, Blue Origin unveiled a mockup of the Blue Moon lander at the Washington D.C. Convention Center and released specification details for the autonomous lander planned to land up to 6.5 t (14,000 lb) on the Moon, to be powered by the newly unveiled BE-7. Blue Moon-derived concepts aimed at carrying passengers to the Moon were also exhibited. That July, NASA announced that Glenn Research Center and Johnson Space Center would engage in a partnership with Blue Origin to develop a fuel cell power system for the Blue Moon lander, in order to enable it to survive the two-week-long lunar night, during which time solar power is unavailable.

=== Integrated Lander Vehicle ===
In October 2019, the National Team of Blue Origin, Lockheed Martin, Northrop Grumman and Draper Laboratory announced that it would collaborate to create a proposal for the "Human Landing System" (HLS) for NASA's Artemis program. Blue Origin was to serve as the primary contractor, with a variant of its Blue Moon Lunar Lander serving as the descent stage. Lockheed Martin would build the ascent stage, in part based on its Orion crew capsule. Northrop Grumman would build a transfer stage based on its Cygnus spacecraft. The lander was projected to launch on the Blue Origin New Glenn launch vehicle. In April 2020, Blue Origin won a design contract of US$579 million from NASA to advance the design of a human lunar lander for the Artemis program during a 10-month period in 2020–2021. Contracted design work started in 2020 and continued into 2021, when NASA was to evaluate which contractors would be offered contracts for initial demonstration missions and select firms for development and maturation of lunar lander systems. The ILV was aimed at landing NASA astronauts on the Moon as early as 2024, following an uncrewed demonstrator that was to land on the Moon as early as 2023. The ILV descent element was a variant of the Blue Moon lunar lander that Blue Origin had been working on for nearly three years by early 2020. At the end of the year-long program, the ILV was not chosen for further development, NASA having selected instead SpaceX's Starship HLS bid. Although NASA had previously stated it wished to procure multiple Human Landing Systems, it only selected one lander design, citing budgetary limitations.

=== Sustaining Lunar Development crewed lander ===
==== NASA bidding and contract ====
In May 2023, NASA selected Blue Moon as the second lander procured under the Artemis HLS program, under Appendix P of the NextSTEP-2 contracting structure, also known as Sustaining Lunar Development. Blue Moon was proposed by a renewed National Team, with slightly different composition than that which had developed the Integrated Lander Vehicle. The total value of the contract was approximately US$3.4 billion; Blue Origin stated that it was providing at least that amount of funding itself to the Blue Moon project. Blue Moon had successfully competed with the Dynetics ALPACA for the contract; NASA stated that the lower cost and technical strengths of Blue Moon led to its selection. Appendix P had been open to bidding, with the exception of SpaceX, which had received a similar contract under Option B of Appendix H of NextSTEP-2, as provided for by the original HLS contract.

=== Initial crewed Moon landing ===
In October 2025, in response to mounting concerns over the timeline for development of Starship HLS, acting NASA administrator Sean Duffy announced the contract for a lander for the first Artemis Moon landing — at that time planned to be the Artemis III mission — was being opened up. Duffy expected Blue Origin to submit a proposal. As of April 2026, Blue Origin has not publicly announced details, but it had earlier been reported that while Blue Moon Mark 2 could likely not be delivered before the 2030s, Blue Origin had begun preliminary work on a crewed lander based on Blue Moon Mark 1, tentatively called Mark 1.5, which could be produced in time for the initial Moon landing. Under the revised Artemis timeline as of April 2026, one or both of Starship HLS and a Blue Moon lander will be tested in Earth orbit during the Artemis III mission.

== List of vehicles ==
No.	Name	Type	Status	Flights	Total flight time	Notes
MK1-101	Endurance	Mark 1	Active	0	0h	First flight test

== Missions ==
=== Mark 1 Pathfinder ===
Blue Moon Pathfinder is a planned flight test of a prototype Blue Moon Mark 1 lander. The mission will demonstrate critical technologies, including the BE-7 engine, cryogenic fluid power and propulsion systems, avionics, continuous downlink communications, and precision landing with an accuracy within 100 meters (330 ft). The Pathfinder mission is partially funded by NASA's Commercial Lunar Payload Services program, under which Blue Origin was awarded US$6.1 million in July 2024 to transport the Stereo Cameras for Lunar Plume Surface Studies payload.

== See also ==
- Apollo Lunar Module
- Lanyue – Chinese crewed lunar lander
- LK (spacecraft) – Soviet crewed lunar lander
- Starship HLS – SpaceX's lunar lander variant of the Starship spacecraft
- Altair (spacecraft) – the crewed lander component of NASA's cancelled Constellation program
- List of crewed lunar lander designs
- Comparison of crewed space vehicles
