= Integrated Lander Vehicle =

Human spaceflight lunar lander design concept

Integrated Landing Vehicle
- Designer: National Team (Blue Origin, Lockheed Martin, Northrop Grumman, Draper Laboratory)
- Country of origin: US
- Applications: crewed lunar lander

Production
- Status: Selected by NASA as the second HLS Lander
- Built: 0

The Integrated Lander Vehicle (ILV) was a human spaceflight lunar lander design concept proposed in 2020/21 for the NASA Human Landing System (HLS) component of the Artemis program. Blue Origin was the lead contractor for the multi-element lunar lander that was to include major components from several large US government space contractors including Lockheed Martin, Northrop Grumman, and Draper Laboratory.

The lander concept was initiated in 2019, and in April 2020, Blue Origin won a US$579 million contract from NASA for a year-long design concept study to be completed in early 2021 in competition with two other designs. NASA had intended to subsequently issue build and test contracts to one or two of the three 2020 awardees in order to advance the human landing element of the Artemis Program. In the event, the ILV proposal was not selected by NASA in April 2021, and a sole HLS award was won by SpaceX with the Starship HLS proposal.

Blue Origin protested the award to SpaceX at the US Government Accountability Office, but lost the protest by late July. In mid-August, Blue Origin filed a lawsuit in the US Court of Federal Claims challenging "NASA's unlawful and improper evaluation of proposals."

The National Team of Blue Origin/Northrop Grumman/Lockheed-Martin/Draper was just one of three organizations who developed lunar lander designs for the Artemis program over a year-long period in 2020–21 under the NASA HLS funding rubric. The funding for the design process during 2020/21 was that NASA would pay the combined contractors US$579 million in design development funding. The other teams selected were Dynetics—with SNC and other unspecified companies with the Dynetics Human Landing System (DHLS)—with US$253 million in NASA funding, and SpaceX, with its Starship HLS concept, with US$135 million in NASA design funding.

== History ==
Initial design work for the Integrated Lander Vehicle began in 2019.

ILV was designed by "the National Team", consisting of Blue Origin, Lockheed Martin, Northrop Grumman, and Draper. Blue Origin led the combined integration effort, and designed the descent element. Northrop Grumman designed the transfer element, for the initial engine firing to place the ILV on a trajectory from the Gateway space station in NRHO (near-rectilinear halo orbit) and toward the lunar surface with an initial descent burn. Lockheed-Martin designed the ascent element, that will depart the lunar surface and return the astronauts to the Gateway and Orion capsule in lunar orbit.

The HLS initial design phase was planned to be a ten-month program, ending on 28 February 2021, where NASA planned to evaluate which contractors would be offered contracts for initial demonstration missions and select firms for development and maturation of their lunar lander system designs in February. However, on 27 January 2021, NASA informed each of the HLS contractors that the original ten-month program would be extended two months to end on or before 30 April 2021.

On April 16, 2021, NASA rejected Integrated Lander Vehicle and instead selected Starship HLS for crewed lunar lander development plus the two lunar demonstration flights, in a contract valued at US$2.94 billion over several years. There were technical weaknesses identified in the Blue Origin proposal which was not selected. "Immature propulsion and communications systems, along with concerns about third party suppliers, 'create serious doubt as to the realism of Blue Origin's proposed development schedule,' according to the source selection statement" from NASA. The significant redesigns necessary of ILV to build "a more sustainable architecture" for the long term were also called into question. Additionally, NASA found that Blue Origin did not provide a comprehensive plan to operate the vehicle commercially, beyond the NASA contracted work.

Although NASA had previously stated it wanted multiple dissimilar Human Landing Systems, "only one design was selected for an initial uncrewed demonstration and the first crewed landing, due to significant budget constraints" based on the HLS funds allocated by Congress. NASA has indicated that Blue Origin would be free to compete for subsequent missions that are not a part of the initial two demonstration flights. It is unclear what plans exist within Blue Origin for continuing on with the work, considering the Moon landing system architecture had become dependent on the existence of major subsystems being designed and built by other vendors, who also did not receive more NASA funding after early 2021.

Blue Origin protested the award to SpaceX at the US Government Accountability Office, but lost the protest. On 30 July 2021, the GAO rejected the protest and found that "NASA did not violate procurement law" in awarding the contract to SpaceX, who bid a much lower cost and more capable human and cargo lunar landing capability for NASA Artemis. Soon after the appeal was rejected, a contracted payment of $300 million was made to SpaceX. The protest action delayed NASA from authorizing work on the contract, and thus delayed the start of work by SpaceX for 95 days.

In mid-August, Blue Origin filed a lawsuit in the US Court of Federal Claims challenging "NASA's unlawful and improper evaluation of proposals."

== Description ==
The ILV lander system design consisted of three elements: a transfer element, a descent element, and an ascent element. ILV was proposed to be used for long-duration crewed lunar landings as part of NASA's Artemis program. The Integrated Lander Vehicle (ILV)—also known as the "National HLS"—was designed for long-duration in-space use, as well as long stays on the lunar surface. The Blue Origin ILV system was proposed to NASA to dock in lunar orbit either with the Lunar Gateway or with the Orion crew vehicle.

If built, the ILV HLS variant was tentatively planned to be launched to lunar orbit by one of several different launch vehicles—including, potentially, the Blue Origin New Glenn or the United Launch Alliance Vulcan Centaur—for the lunar transit to join up with the NASA Lunar Gateway and a NASA crew to be shuttled to the lunar surface. In the mission concept, a NASA Orion spacecraft would carry the NASA crew to the lander where they would depart and descend to the lunar surface in the ILV. After lunar surface operations, the ILV ascent element would ascend and return the crew to the Orion.

=== Transfer element ===
To be built by Northrop Grumman based on Cygnus cargo vehicle. Uses the BE-7 engine.

=== Descent element ===
To be built by Blue Origin, based on Blue Moon proposal - To use BE-7 engine.

=== Ascent element ===
To be built by Lockheed-Martin - based on technology used in Orion capsule. Uses 3 XLR-132 engines for main propulsion.

== See also ==
- Blue Moon, a previously conceived Blue Origin spacecraft that made up substantial parts of the descent element of the ILV design proposal
- Dynetics HLS
- Starship HLS
