= Dynetics =

Aerospace and defense manufacturer in the United States

Dynetics Inc.
- Type: Subsidiary
- Industry: Defense, Aerospace, Automotive, IT, Cybersecurity
- Founded: 1974; 52 years ago
- Headquarters: 1002 Explorer Building, Huntsville, Alabama, United States
- Area served: Worldwide
- Key people: Steve Cook ( Group President); Paul Engola (Group Vice President)
- Revenue: US$293 M (2015)
- Owner: Leidos
- Number of employees: 1,900
- Parent: Leidos
- Website: www.dynetics.com

Dynetics is an American applied science and information technology company headquartered in Huntsville, Alabama. Its primary customers are the United States Department of Defense (DoD), the United States Intelligence Community, and National Aeronautics and Space Administration (NASA).

== History ==
Herschel Matheny and Dr. Stephen Gilbert founded Dynetics in 1974. During the 1980s, Dynetics expanded to include electro-optic and infrared sensors, missile systems analysis and design, software development, modeling and simulation, and foreign materiel exploitation of radars, missiles, and missile seekers.

In the 1990s, Dynetics continued to grow its core business and expanded into the automotive supply industry as a provider of electrical test systems. Since 2000, Dynetics has been selling information technology (IT) and cybersecurity services, including winning a contract to provide IT services to NASA's Marshall Space Flight Center (MSFC). The company entered the space business with the development of the FASTSAT (Fast Affordable Science and Technology Satellite) nanosatellite and the purchase of Orion Propulsion. Its space business continued to grow with a 2013 selection to compete for the Space Launch System Advanced Booster design contract with NASA.

On December 27, 2019, Leidos announced the purchase of Dynetics for US$1.65 billion, and acquisition was complete on 31 January 2020.

== Operations ==
Dynetics divides its services and products into the following categories: intelligence, missiles, aviation, cyber, automotive, and space. The company opened a new building in 2012 called "The Solutions Complex" that is 226,500 ft^{2} (21,040 m^{2}) of research and development facilities located in Cummings Research Park in Huntsville, Alabama. Dynetics operates remote operations additionally in Michigan, Florida, Virginia, Ohio, and Texas.

== Projects ==
- In 2009, Dynetics teamed up with Freedom Information Systems, Inc. CIBER, MacAulay-Brown/Gray Research, and MEI Technologies and won the Marshall Space Flight Center (MSFC) contract. This contract is valued at approximately US$335 million over five years and covers IT security services; IT planning; telecommunication services; applications and web services; computing and audio visual information services.
- In 2010, Dynetics teamed up with Marshall Space Flight Center and the Von Braun Center for Science and Innovation (VCSI) to build the FASTSAT.
- In 2012, Dynetics submitted a proposal to NASA based on affordability, reliability, and performance for the F-1 engine, Main Propulsion System, and Structure risk reduction tasks for a possible SLS contract. Dynetics, with partner Aerojet Rocketdyne, was chosen and charged with the task of testing and manufacturing innovative engine components such as an integrated power pack, the primary rotating machinery of the engine.
- Dynetics is to be a key partner to Aerojet Rocketdyne in the development of the AR1 rocket engine. Under a joint venture agreement, Dynetics is to supply elements of the AR1 engine's main propulsion system, the ignition system, and ground support equipment, along with analysis support to critical engine designs.

Dynetics served as systems integrator for the development of what was then the world's largest precision-guided air-dropped system, the 22,600 lb (10,300 kg) MOAB bomb.

In May 2014, Dynetics announced that they will build up to 18 satellites to orbit Earth, in order to gather more data about the planet for the government and businesses. The company will be partnering with OmniEarth LLC, Harris Corp. and Draper Laboratories for the project. Dynetics also partnered with rocket propulsion company Aerojet Rocketdyne to help design upgrades to NASA's Space Launch System.

In 2016, Dynetics was one of four companies to be awarded a contract by DARPA for an air-recoverable experimental unmanned aerial vehicle. Dynetics was chosen from the four companies to build the aircraft, which became the Dynetics X-61 Gremlins. The first X-61A made its maiden flight in January 2020.

=== Dynetics Human Landing System ===
Dynetics, working with Sierra Nevada Corporation's Space Systems participated in some early human landing system (HLS) design studies under NASA's HLS Appendix E program. They submitted a proposal to NASA for HLS Appendix H for a concept called the Dynetics Human Landing System (DHLS), which in April 2020 was one of three proposals funded for further design work in a US$253 million in NASA development funding contract during 2020/2021, along with Blue Origin's Integrated Lander Vehicle (US$579 million) and SpaceX' Starship HLS (US$135 million). At the end of the ten-month program, NASA will evaluate which contractors will be offered contracts for initial demonstration missions and select firms for development and maturation of lunar lander systems.

NASA's Stephen Jurczyk identified the fuel drop tanks and low crew module as strengths, but the propulsion system was a low-maturity risk. They received a management rating of "very good" but a technical rating of "marginal", making the Dynetics proposal the lowest-rated project.

Robert Wright of Dynetics reported that the Dynetics team selected methane and LOX as the fuel/oxidizer system for their HLS lander because their studies indicated that this choice offered the best combination of performance and long-term sustainability.
