= Dynetics HLS =

Crewed lunar lander under development

Dynetics ALPACA lunar lander
- Designer: Dynetics
- Country of origin: US
- Operator: Dynetics, NASA
- Applications: Crew and cargo lunar lander

Specifications
- Crew capacity: 2-4
- Power: Solar
- Design life: 14-42 days

Production
- Status: under development

Related spacecraft
- Derivatives: Crew / cargo variants

The Dynetics Autonomous Logistics Platform for All-Moon Cargo Access (ALPACA)—also known as Dynetics HLS—(ILV) is a human spaceflight lunar lander design concept proposed in 2020/21 for the NASA Human Landing System (HLS) component of the Artemis program. Dynetics was the lead contractor for the ALPACA lander—other contractors included Sierra Nevada Corporation—for NASA's Artemis Program.

The lander concept was initiated in 2019, and in April 2020, Dynetics won a US$253 million contract from NASA for a year-long design concept study to be completed in early 2021. NASA had intended to subsequently issue build and test contracts to one or two of the three 2020 awardees in order to advance the human landing element of the Artemis Program. In the event, the Dynetics HLS proposal was not selected by NASA in April 2021, and a sole HLS award was won by SpaceX with the Starship HLS proposal.

However, Dynetics, together with Blue Origin, protested this decision with the GAO through the S. 1260, also known as the US Innovation and Competitiveness Act. The appeal was unsuccessful, and on 30 July 2021, GAO upheld NASA's choice of SpaceX as the sole recipient of the HLS contract.

Dynetics resubmitted their proposal under Appendix N, which covered sustainable lunar landers. On September 14, NASA awarded five companies a contract to advance in the process, with Dynetics receiving a $40.8 million contract.

In terms of physical size, the Dynetics design is the smallest of the three proposals funded by NASA in 2020; however, it is the second largest in terms of development funding secured from NASA. The ALPACA (if ultimately selected) will land and then ascend back into orbit and rendezvous with the NASA Orion or the Lunar Gateway. ALPACA is expected to be subsequently proposed to be used to deliver lunar cargo such as ISRU technology, base modules and pressurized rovers to the surface of the Moon.

== History ==
Dynetics is one of three organizations who developed a NASA-funded lunar lander design for the Artemis program over a year-long period in 2020–2021, starting in May 2020. The milestone-based requirements of the design contract included NASA paying Dynetics US$253 million in design development funding. The other teams selected in 2020 were the 'National Team'—led by Blue Origin but including Lockheed Martin, Northrop Grumman, and Draper (with US$579 million in NASA design funding) and SpaceX (with US$135 million in NASA funding).

At the end of the ten-month program on 28 February 2021, NASA had planned to evaluate which contractors would be offered contracts for initial demonstration missions and select firms for development and maturation of their lunar lander system designs. However, on 27 January 2021, NASA informed each of the HLS contractors that the original ten-month program would be extended two months to end on or before 30 April 2021.

In April 2021, NASA rejected the Dynetics HLS design and instead selected Starship HLS for crewed lunar lander development plus the two lunar demonstration flights, in a contract valued at US$2.89 billion over several years. There were technical weaknesses identified in the Dynetics proposal which was not selected but also budgetary constraints.

Although NASA had previously stated it wanted to contract for multiple dissimilar Human Landing Systems, "only one design was selected for an initial uncrewed demonstration and the first crewed landing, due to significant budget constraints" based on the HLS funds allocated by Congress. NASA has indicated that Dynetics would be free to compete for subsequent missions that are not a part of the initial two demonstration flights.

== Design ==
=== Crew compartment ===
The Dynetics HLS vehicle has a low crew cabin making ingress and egress very simple. The crew compartment also includes an integrated airlock to allow for easy EVA's without depressurizing the whole cabin. The crew cabin can be converted into a base module or a pressurized lunar rover. In September 2020 a full-scale mockup of the lander was completed in order to test the interior layout and its ingress / egress capabilities.

== Launch vehicle ==
The ALPACA is designed to be launched on ULA's Vulcan Centaur rocket. Vulcan launches the full ALPACA vehicle to NRHO. Four more Vulcan launches carry either a Centaur Tanker to refuel the liquid methane, liquid oxygen tanks of the lander or a logistics vehicle (MULE).

Alternatively, if available, a SLS Block 1B could launch the entire fully fueled lunar vehicle into lunar orbit using its Exploration Upper Stage.

== Reusability ==
The ALPACA is refueled in lunar orbit in four Vulcan Centaur flights. The ALPACA can be reused for both crewed lunar landings and autonomous cargo landings. The first ALPACA will be reused autonomously after its first crewed landing as a proof of concept for NASA. In order to prevent boil-off, refueling and landing will take place in 2-3 week intervals. Long term, the ALPACA could be refueled from liquid oxygen created in-situ on the surface from lunar water ice.

== NASA technical review ==
The Dynetics HLS scored highest of the proposed landers in NASA's initial technical review in August 2020. The largest issue identified according to NASA is the advanced experimental thrust structure used in the Dynetics design, and that it could pose a threat to the development time as it relies on immature technology.

However, in Option A it had the scored the lowest. The largest issue identified was negative mass margins, meaning it wasn't able to carry out the listed mission without decreasing the mass of the lander.

== See also ==
- SpaceX Starship
- Blue Moon
- Integrated Lander Vehicle
- Apollo Lunar Module
- Sierra Nevada Corporation
- Boeing Lunar Lander
