= Starship HLS =

Lunar lander variant of SpaceX Starship

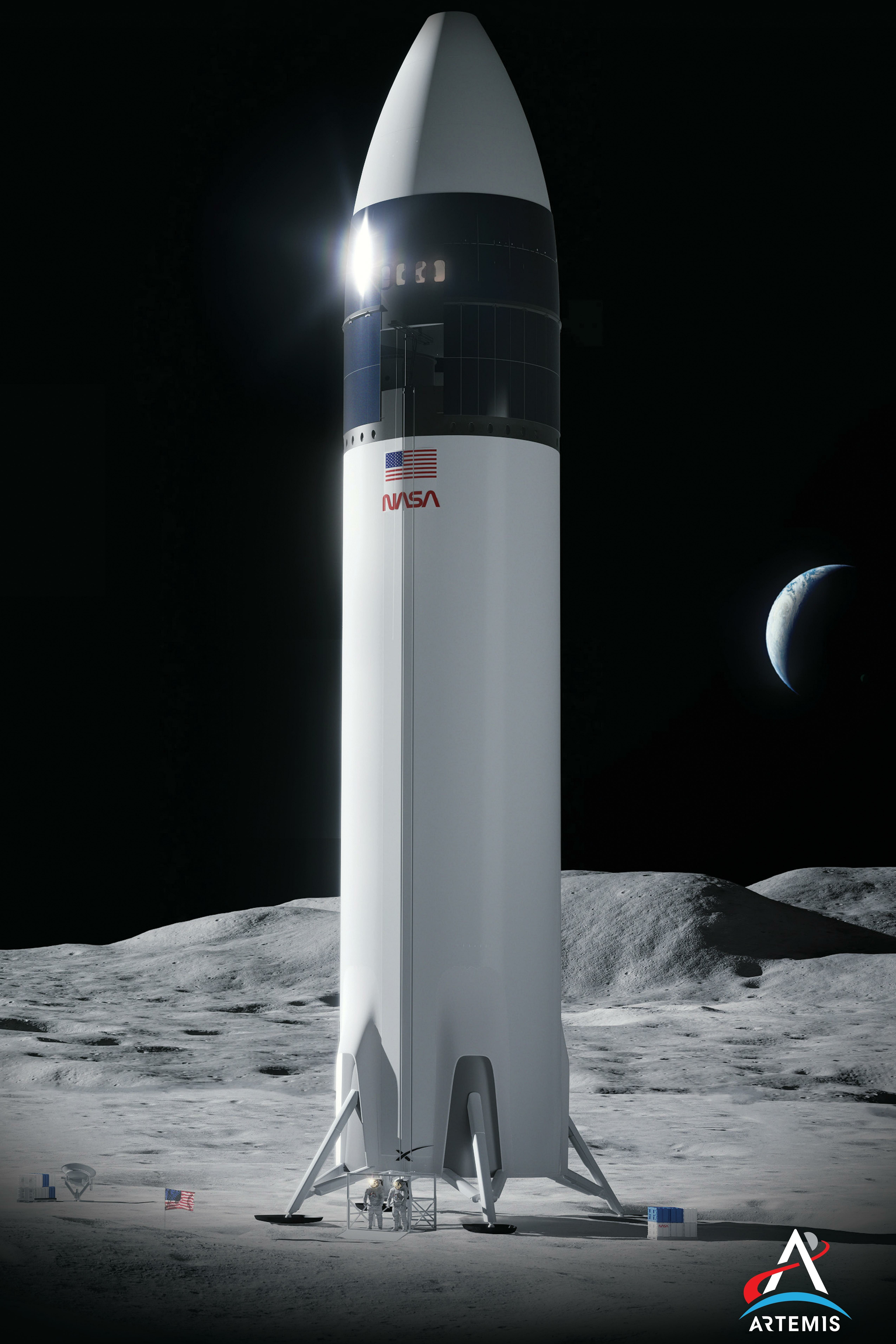
- Rendering of a future Starship HLS on the Moon
- Manufacturer: SpaceX
- Country of origin: United States
- Operator: SpaceX
- Applications: Lunar lander

Specifications
- Spacecraft type: Crewed, reusable
- Crew capacity: 2–4
- Regime: Cislunar space

Dimensions
- Height: 52 m (171 ft)
- Diameter: 9 m (30 ft)

Capacity

Payload to lunar surface
- Mass: 100,000 kg (220,000 lb)

Production
- Status: In development
- Maiden launch: 2027 (planned)

Related spacecraft
- Derived from: SpaceX Starship (spacecraft)
- Flown with: SpaceX Super Heavy

Starship HLS
- Powered by: 3 Raptor engines; 3 Raptor vacuum engines; RCS thrusters
- Propellant: CH_{4} / LOX
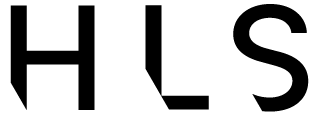

Starship HLS (Human Landing System) is a lunar lander variant of the Starship spacecraft that is slated to transfer astronauts from a lunar orbit to the surface of the Moon and back. It is being designed and built by SpaceX under the Human Landing System contract to NASA as a critical element of NASA's Artemis program to land a crew of astronauts on the Moon.

The mission plan calls for a Super Heavy booster to launch a Starship HLS into Earth orbit, where it will be refueled by multiple Starship tanker spacecraft before performing a rendezvous and docking with the crewed Orion spacecraft that will be launched from Earth by a NASA Space Launch System (SLS) launcher. HLS will then perform a TLI burn. A crew of two (or more) astronauts will transfer from Orion to HLS, which will then descend to the lunar surface for a stay of approximately seven days, including four planned moonwalks. It will then return the crew to Orion in NRHO.

In the third phase of its HLS procurement process, NASA awarded SpaceX a contract in April 2021 to develop, produce, and demonstrate Starship HLS. An uncrewed lunar landing demonstration originally planned for 2025 has been delayed. Under a revised Artemis architecture announced by NASA in 2026, a Starship HLS test article is to rendezvous and dock with Orion in low Earth orbit during the Artemis III mission in 2027, and the first crewed lunar landing, with either Starship HLS or Blue Moon, is targeted for the Artemis IV mission in early 2028.

Starship itself has been in privately funded development by SpaceX since the mid-2010s, but development of the HLS variant is being funded under NASA's Human Landing System contracts.

== Description ==
=== Starship Human Landing System ===
The Starship Human Landing System program includes the development and operational use of several Starship spacecraft variants by SpaceX, including the Starship HLS ship—optimized to operate on and in the vicinity of the Moon—as well as a Starship depot that will store propellant in Earth orbit, and the Starship tanker designed to fly multiple trips to orbit from Earth's surface to transport the necessary fuel and oxygen to the on-orbit depot. The concept of operations for a single lunar human landing mission will involve all three ship variants, as well as docking with another NASA-supplied spacecraft in near-rectilinear halo orbit (NRHO) around the Moon.

Unlike the standard Starship spacecraft, both the Starship HLS and Starship depot ships do not re-enter Earth's atmosphere, which allows for the removal of the spacecraft's atmospheric heat shield and flight control surfaces (fins). This reduction in mass allows for a smaller number of Starship tanker launches required for refueling once the spacecraft is in orbit. Like other Starship variants, Starship HLS and Starship depot are equipped with six Raptor engines, which are used during launch and the majority of the landing and ascent phases.

When within 100 meters of the lunar surface, the HLS variant is planned to use high‑thrust landing engines located in the mid‑body section of the spacecraft to avoid plume impingement with the lunar regolith. The landing engines burn gaseous oxygen and methane instead of the liquid oxygen and methane used by the Raptors. Electrical power is supplied by a band of solar panels around the circumference of the vehicle. HLS has the capability to loiter in lunar orbit for 100 days.

According to NASA, minimizing changes in vehicle configuration and making the design and development of Starship HLS as common as possible will benefit future Starship HLS builds by eliminating the need for additional testing, evaluation, and verification of different vehicle designs. NASA added this will also allow SpaceX to accelerate vehicle builds to help ensure availability and on-time delivery for mission integration.

Both the Starship HLS ship and the Starship depot—propellant depot that will remain in Earth orbit and collect/store the requisite propellant to refill the HLS ship before departure on a trans-lunar trajectory—will use a special purpose insulating tile that will provide micrometeoroid and orbital debris protection as well as insulate the depot from solar and Earth-thermal radiation in order to retain the cryogenic liquid oxygen and liquid methane for long-duration orbital storage. These in-space insulation tiles are different from the ceramic tiles used on Starships that must reenter Earth's atmosphere, such as the tiles on the Starship propellant tankers that will transport fuel/oxidizer cargo to fill the Starship depot.

=== Cargo variant ===
In April 2024, NASA reported that work was underway on the cargo specific variant of the lander. NASA expects this variant to be ready and in service by Artemis VII. The cargo variant will be referred to by NASA as Human-class Delivery Landers and represent, as of June 2024, the highest capacity landers available to NASA under the current lunar exploration push.

== Mission profiles ==
=== Propellant transfer test campaign ===
Before a lunar mission, SpaceX must complete two HLS flight-test milestones in Earth orbit: a long-duration flight to characterize propellant storage and boil-off, followed by a ship-to-ship propellant transfer in which a second Starship rendezvouses with the first. In September 2026, SpaceX said both tests were targeted for 2026, depending on the progress of Starship V3 flight tests, and that V3 vehicles carry docking ports and DragonEye navigation sensors for rendezvous. A NASA schedule presented at the International Astronautical Congress in October 2026 placed the propellant transfer demonstration in early 2027.

=== Lunar missions ===
Prior to the launch of the HLS vehicle from Earth, a Starship configured as a propellant depot would be launched into an Earth orbit and then be partially or fully filled by between four and fourteen (Note: In the documentation of SpaceX's HLS bid, a conservative figure of 14 tanker flights is used. Musk has stated that with a tanker payload mass of 150 tons, four to eight tanker flights would be necessary, depending on the payload mass on Starship HLS itself and the intended fuel load (since the mission profile may allow for a less than full tank).) Starship tanker flights carrying propellant. As such, this spacecraft will be used in conjunction with the Starship booster (called Super Heavy) and two additional Starship spacecraft variants, "tanker" and "propellant depot", that were already planned prior to the NASA HLS contract.

Musk said in 2021 that between "four and eight" tanker launches would be required. The same year, the US Government Accountability Office (GAO) said that SpaceX would "require 16 launches overall", and in 2023, a NASA official estimated the number of Starship launches required for one lunar landing to be "in the high teens". In 2024, SpaceX vice president of customer operations estimated that the number of tanker launches would be "10-ish", though this number is subject to change. The launches will need to be in rapid succession in order to maintain schedule constraints and limit the loss of liquid cryogenic propellants due to boiloff.

Artemis III Concept of Operations infographic

The Starship HLS vehicle would then launch and rendezvous with the already-loaded propellant depot and refuel before transiting from Earth orbit to Lunar orbit.

Once HLS is in a near-rectilinear halo orbit (NRHO) around the Moon, an Orion spacecraft would be launched by a Space Launch System rocket and dock with the waiting Starship HLS lander in order to transfer passengers. After two to four of the crew had transferred into the HLS, it would depart and descend to the lunar surface. After lunar surface operations, Starship HLS will lift off from the Moon and return to lunar orbit to rendezvous with Orion. The crew would then transfer back to Orion and depart for Earth. Although not confirmed yet, Starship HLS could, in theory, be refueled in orbit to carry more crews and cargo to the surface of the Moon.

== History ==
=== Background ===
In the early 2010s, NASA originally planned to use the Orion spacecraft and the Space Launch System (SLS) to land astronauts on the Moon. The design of the Orion capsule was inherited from the Constellation program, a defunct crewed lunar program of the 2000s. The SLS is a launch vehicle NASA developed as replacement for the Space Shuttle following its retirement in 2011, and to bolster Shuttle-related jobs that would otherwise have been lost. The SLS is unable to launch Orion into low lunar orbit like the Saturn V rocket did during the Apollo program.

The closest to the Moon SLS can launch Orion is into NRHO, an elliptical orbit that approaches the Moon. Descending to the Moon from NRHO requires considerably more energy than from a low lunar orbit and only allows a descent once every 6.5 days.

To address these challenges, NASA issued a request for proposals to commercial companies to develop a Human Landing System (HLS) in 2018. HLS lunar landing vehicles should be able to travel from Earth to NRHO, where they would meet with Orion, land on the Moon, and later return to NRHO to dock with Orion once again.

SpaceX had plans to develop a large interplanetary vehicle since the 2000s to fulfill their goal of colonizing Mars. In response to NASA's request for Human Landing System proposals, SpaceX adapted the design of their base Starship vehicle into a variant suited to carry NASA's mission of landing two astronauts on the Moon from NRHO: the Starship HLS.

=== Selection of the lander ===
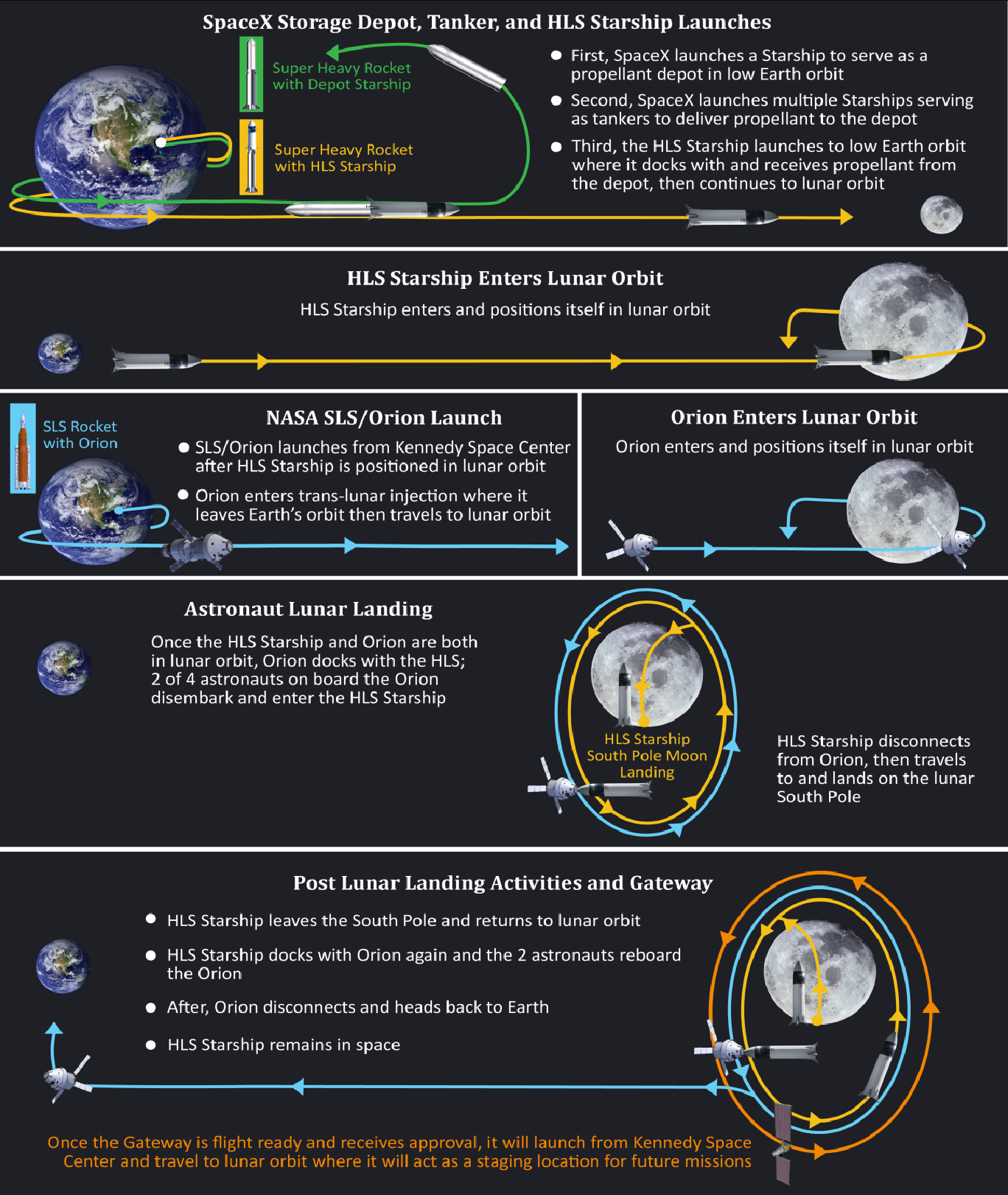
Original mission profile for Artemis III, with Orion and Starship HLS

The initial NASA-contracted design work for a NASA-specific Starship variant started in May 2020 when SpaceX was selected for an Artemis III program award called "Option A", with selection and funding for full-development occurring in April 2021, when Starship HLS was selected by NASA to land "the first woman and the next man" on the Moon for the Artemis III mission (subsequently delayed by NASA until Artemis IV).

==== Selection of the Starship lunar lander ====
In 2021, NASA entered into a firm fixed-price contract with SpaceX valued at US$2.89 billion, spread over a number of years to develop and manufacture the Starship HLS lunar lander, as well as the execution of two operational flights: an uncrewed demonstration mission and a crewed lunar landing.

Starship HLS was first made public when it was initially selected by NASA in April 2020 for a design study as part of their Artemis program, which aims to land humans on the Moon. SpaceX was one of three teams selected to develop competing lunar lander designs for the Artemis program over a year-long period starting in May 2020.

The other landers in consideration were Dynetics HLS, proposed by aerospace manufacturer Dynetics, and the Integrated Lander Vehicle, proposed by a team led by Blue Origin. NASA intended to later select and fund at most two of these landers to continue to perform initial demonstration flights.

On 16 April 2021, NASA selected only Starship HLS for crewed lunar lander development plus two lunar demonstration flights – one uncrewed and one crewed – no earlier than 2024. The contract was valued at US$2.89 billion over a number of years. Two NASA Artemis astronauts are to land on the first crewed Starship HLS landing. NASA had previously stated that it preferred to fund development of multiple Human Landing System proposals with dissimilar capabilities; however, "only one design was selected for an initial uncrewed demonstration and the first crewed landing, due to significant budget constraints" for the human landing system program imposed by the US Congress. NASA stated that the unselected proposals – Dynetics HLS and Blue Origin Integrated Lander Vehicle – as well as landers from other companies would be eligible for later lunar landing contracts.

==== Opposition by competing companies ====
On 26 April 2021, Blue Origin and Dynetics separately filed formal protests of the award to SpaceX at the US Government Accountability Office (GAO). On 30 July 2021, the GAO rejected both protests and found that "NASA did not violate procurement law" in awarding the contract to SpaceX, who bid a much lower cost and more capable human and cargo lunar landing capability for NASA Artemis. The protest action delayed NASA from authorizing work on the contract, and thus delayed the start of work by SpaceX for 95 days. Blue Origin produced infographic posters that highlight the complexity of Starship HLS, for example the fact that on orbit refuelling with cryogenic fuels like that Starship HLS uses has never been demonstrated, while stating that its design uses "proven technology".

On 13 August 2021, Blue Origin filed a lawsuit in the US Court of Federal Claims challenging "NASA's unlawful and improper evaluation of proposals". Blue Origin asked the court for an injunction to halt further spending by NASA on the existing contract with SpaceX, and NASA stopped work on the contract on 19 August, after SpaceX had been allowed to work on the NASA-specific parts of Starship HLS for just three weeks since the work had been previously halted in April.

On 4 November 2021, the court granted the federal government's motion to dismiss the case, and NASA announced that it would resume work with SpaceX as soon as possible.

==== Artemis IV contract ("Option B") ====
On 23 March 2022, NASA announced it would be exercising an option under the initial SpaceX HLS contract, known as Option B, that would allow a second-generation Starship HLS design to conduct a demonstration mission after Artemis III.

On 15 November 2022, NASA announced it had awarded SpaceX the Option B contract modification, worth US$1.15 billion, and that this crewed landing is to occur as part of Artemis IV. The Option B HLS will meet NASA's requirements for a "sustainable" HLS. These include the ability to support four crew members and delivering more mass to the surface.

==== Subsequent related NASA contracts ====
After NASA awarded the Option A contract to SpaceX, Congress subsequently directed NASA to extend the HLS program for a second sustainable HLS design, with the requirement that it must be from a second company, and not SpaceX. NASA responded by creating "Appendix P", and specified a lander that would be used for Artemis V as its crewed demonstration flight. In May 2023, Blue Origin was awarded $3.4 billion by NASA to develop their Blue Moon lunar lander.

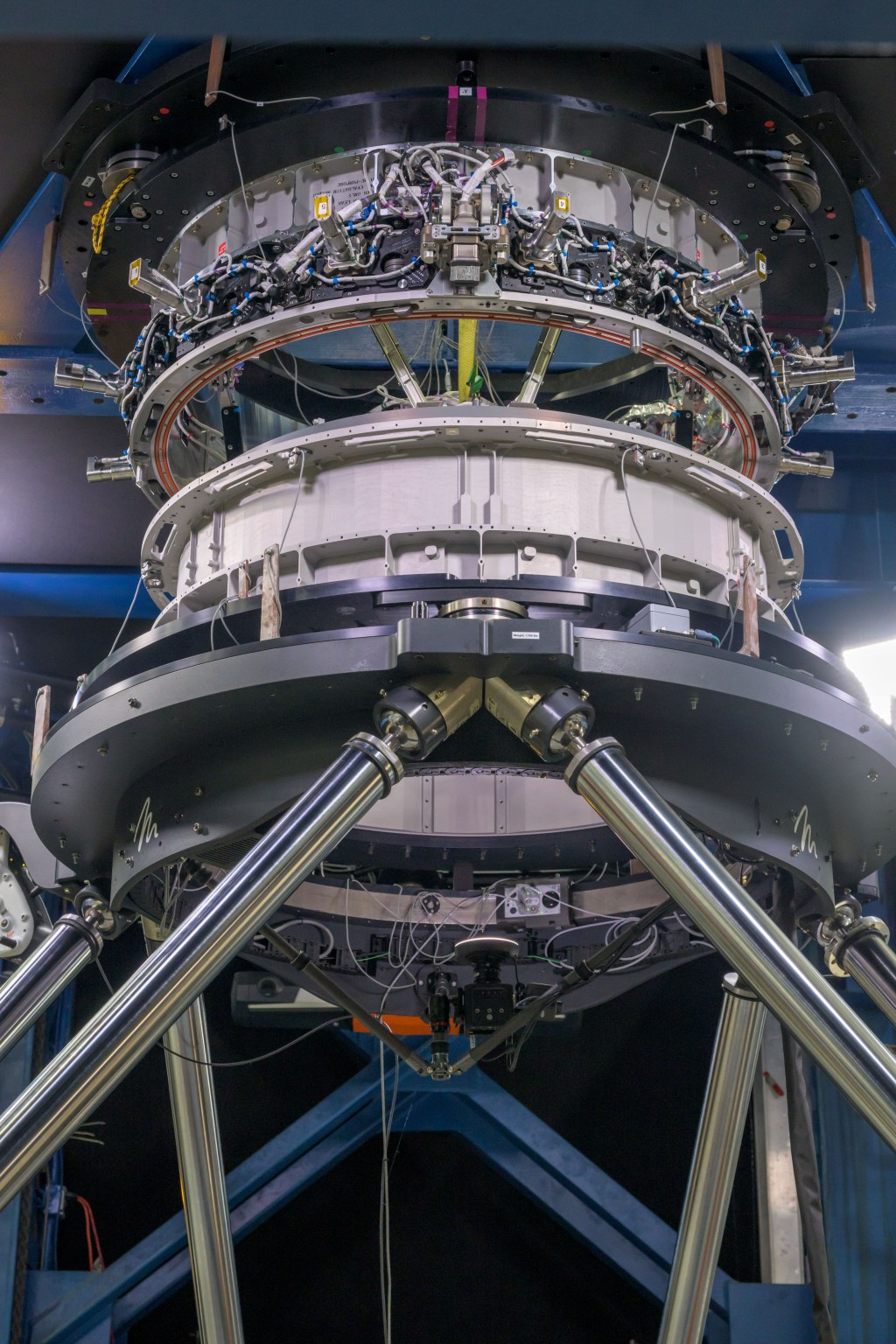
Starship HLS docking system being tested

=== 2021–2023 ===
In 2021, the NASA Office of Inspector General (OIG) warned that the HLS development schedule was unrealistic when compared to other major NASA space flight programs. Stating that space flight programs in the prior 15 years had taken on average 8.5 years from contract award to first operational flight, while the HLS Program was attempting to do so in about half that time. By contrast, NASA OIG noted that the Apollo Lunar Lander took approximately 6 years from contract award to its launch on the Apollo 11 mission while receiving "substantially higher levels of funding" adjusted for inflation. Based on the HLS base period contract award date (May 2020) and the average delay for recent major NASA space flight programs, they estimated that the HLS Program could face up to 3.4 years of delays before operational flights.

In June 2023, NASA's chief of exploration systems development in the HLS development office, Jim Free, said that the Starship HLS's critical design review, required before further funds from the contract could be released to SpaceX, had been delayed until SpaceX completes an orbital refueling demonstration mission. The head of NASA's moon and Mars exploration strategy said that the delay of Artemis III from 2025 to 2026 was partly due to "development challenges" with their contractors (SpaceX and Lockheed Martin).

In November 2023, the US GAO, in their report to the US Congress, outlined several challenges that the Artemis program was facing in development. They noted that as of September 2023 the NASA HLS program had delayed 8 out of 13 key events by at least 6 months, with 2 events being delayed to the year of launch (2025 at the time). The GAO also identified the development of the Raptor engine as a "top risk" for the program and its 2025 timeline, although SpaceX considered the technology behind the Raptor engine to be relatively mature. The GAO noted that SpaceX had made limited progress maturing the technologies needed for in-orbit refueling and cryogenic propellant storage. The GAO concluded in their report to Congress that the Artemis III crewed lunar landing is unlikely to occur in 2025, and that a launch date in early 2027 is more likely.

NASA astronauts tested the elevator concept (crew transfer between the cabin of Starship HLS and the lunar surface) in December 2023.

=== 2024–present ===
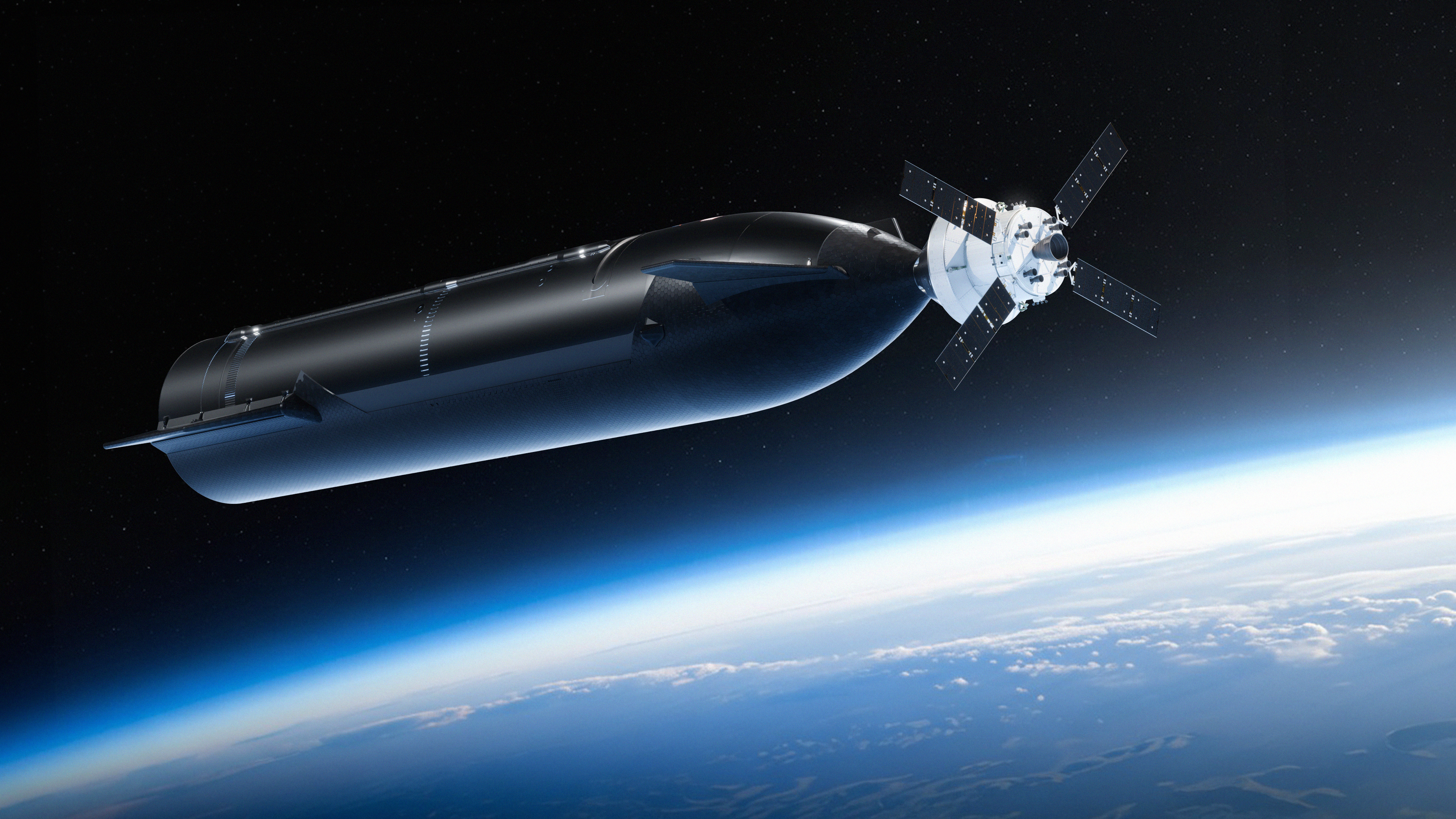
Illustration of a Starship HLS test article docking with an Orion MPCV for Artemis III.

In January 2024, NASA and SpaceX said that the uncrewed Starship HLS lunar landing and ascent test was expected to take place in 2025, with Artemis III being delayed to no earlier than September 2026. The delay was in part due to issues with Orion's heatshield during Artemis I.

In February 2024, SpaceX had produced a functioning life support system mockup and NASA performed a full-scale test of the Starship HLS to the Orion docking transfer system. The same month, NASA said SpaceX had accomplished over 30 HLS-specific milestones by defining and testing hardware needed for power generation, communications, guidance and navigation, propulsion, life support, and space environments protection.

On 14 March 2024, SpaceX successfully tested ship-internal cryogenic propellant transfer on Integrated Flight Test 3.

In a meeting of the United States House Science Subcommittee on Space and Aeronautics on 10 September 2024, Brian Babin and Haley Stevens expressed concerns that the pace of license processing under the FAA's Part 450 commercial launch and reentry regulations could impact the Artemis program since both Blue Origin and SpaceX HLS landers will launch using commercial licenses. Following a further two-month delay by the FAA of Starship flight test 5, SpaceX said government paperwork prevented it from flying Starship quickly to meet commitments to the Artemis program.

In October 2024, NASA stated that the flight test campaign for the ship-to-ship propellant transfer demonstration was slated to start around March 2025 with test completion over the summer when the design certification review by NASA was to take place.

In October 2025, NASA planned to reopen the contract for the Artemis III mission due to several delays to Starship's development.

NASA did not select a replacement lander. In its 2026 architecture update, NASA turned Artemis III into a crewed low Earth orbit demonstration in 2027 in which Orion is to rendezvous and dock with test articles of both Blue Origin's Blue Moon and Starship HLS; astronauts will not enter the Starship test article.

In September 2026, SpaceX began fabricating a flight-article Starship HLS cabin with avionics, power, life support and crew systems. On 28 September 2026, Starship reached orbit for the first time on Flight 14, deploying 26 Starlink V3 satellites; the mission was cut short after a premature engine shutdown.

At the International Astronautical Congress in October 2026, NASA HLS program manager Stephen Creech presented an updated schedule. It calls for a full-scale crew cabin mockup, "Cabin One", to be completed at Starbase by the end of 2026, Artemis III in mid-2027, and the first tanker flight and an uncrewed lunar landing demonstration in late 2027. NASA had not yet chosen whether Starship HLS or Blue Moon would land the Artemis IV crew. Reuters reported that both landers faced delays and that NASA planned meetings over the following months to assess their readiness.

== See also ==
- Apollo program – 1961–1972 American crewed lunar exploration program
- Billionaire space race, SpaceX vs. Blue Origin
- Blue Moon (spacecraft) – Lunar lander family for the Artemis program
- Lanyue – China crewed lunar surface lander
- LK (spacecraft) – Soviet lunar module intended to be used in the Soviet lunar landing attempts
- List of crewed lunar landers
