= Airlock (disambiguation) =

An airlock is a chamber with two air-pressure-tight doors for moving between areas of different air pressure.

Airlock or air lock may also refer to:

- Air lock, an obstruction of liquid flow in pipes
- Airlock (parachute), a safety device
- Airlock (band), a Belgian trip hop group
- Airlock (video game), an action game for the Atari 2600
- Fermentation lock, a device restricting air flow during fermentation
- "Air Lock", third episode of the 1965 Doctor Who serial Galaxy 4
- Airlock Alpha, science fiction website
- A Tear in Space (Airlock), song by Glass Animals

== See also ==
- Lock (disambiguation)
- Vapor lock
