= Symptomatic (disambiguation) =

Symptomatic is the act of displaying characteristics of a disease.

Symptomatic may also refer to:

- Symptomatic (album), by Airlock, 2004
- "Symptomatic", a 2021 song by Peach PRC

== See also ==
- Symptom (disambiguation)
