= Mars suit =

Space suit for the Martian surface

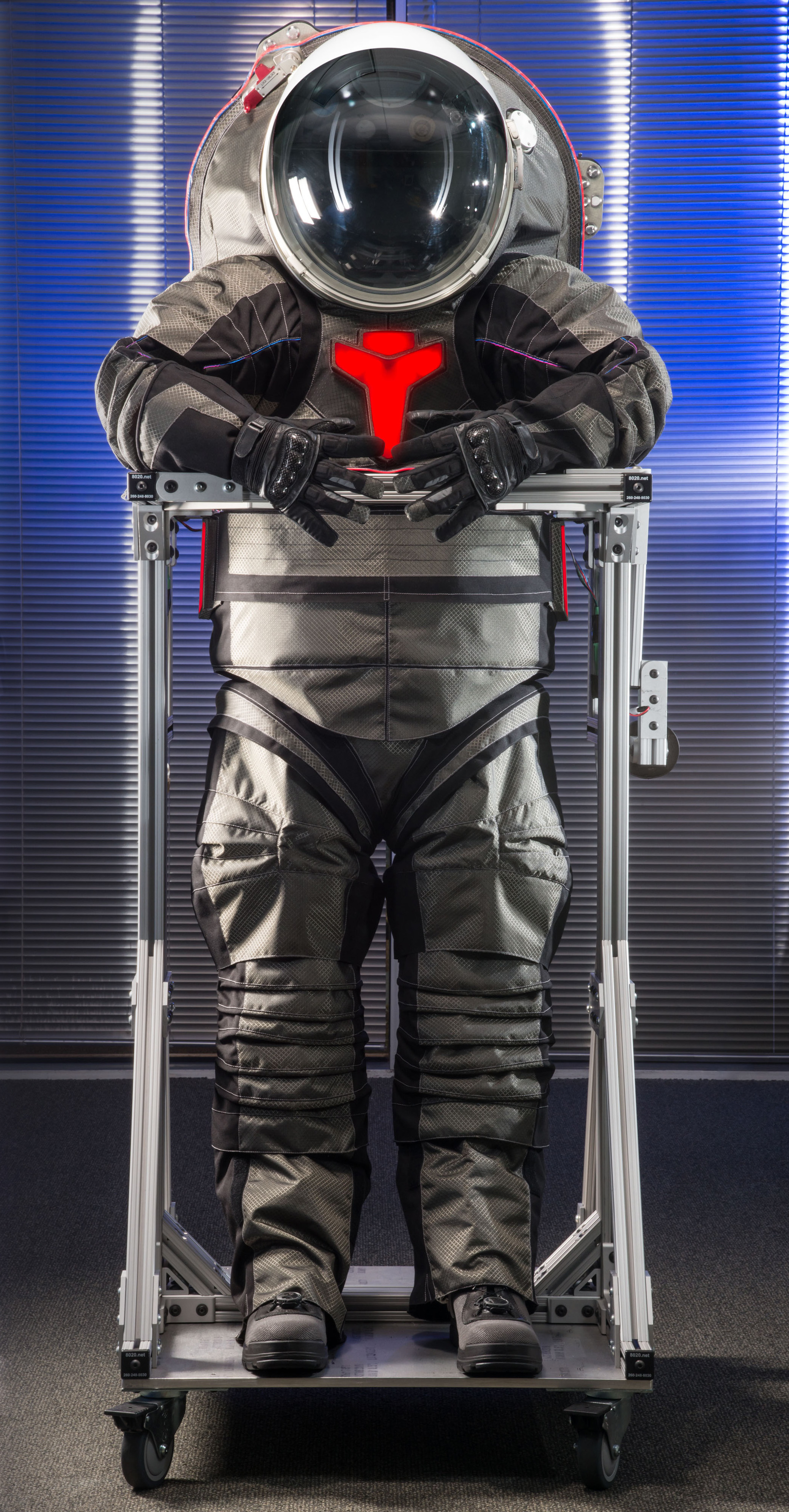
NASA Z-2 spacesuit prototype, which includes technologies in support of developing Martian EVA suits

A Mars suit or Mars space suit is a space suit for EVAs on the planet Mars. Compared to a suit designed for space-walking in the near vacuum of low Earth orbit, Mars suits have a greater focus on actual walking and a need for abrasion resistance. Mars' surface gravity is 37.8% of Earth's, approximately 2.3 times that of the Moon, so weight is a significant concern, but there are fewer thermal demands compared to open space. At the surface the suits would contend with the atmosphere of Mars, which has a pressure of about 0.6 to 1 kilopascal (0.087 to 0.145 psi). On the surface, radiation exposure is a concern, especially solar flare events, which can dramatically increase the amount of radiation over a short time.

Some of the issues a Mars suit for surface operations would face include having enough oxygen for the person as the air is mostly carbon dioxide; in addition the air is also at a much lower pressure than Earth's atmosphere at sea level. Other issues include the Martian dust, low temperatures, and radiation.

== Overview ==
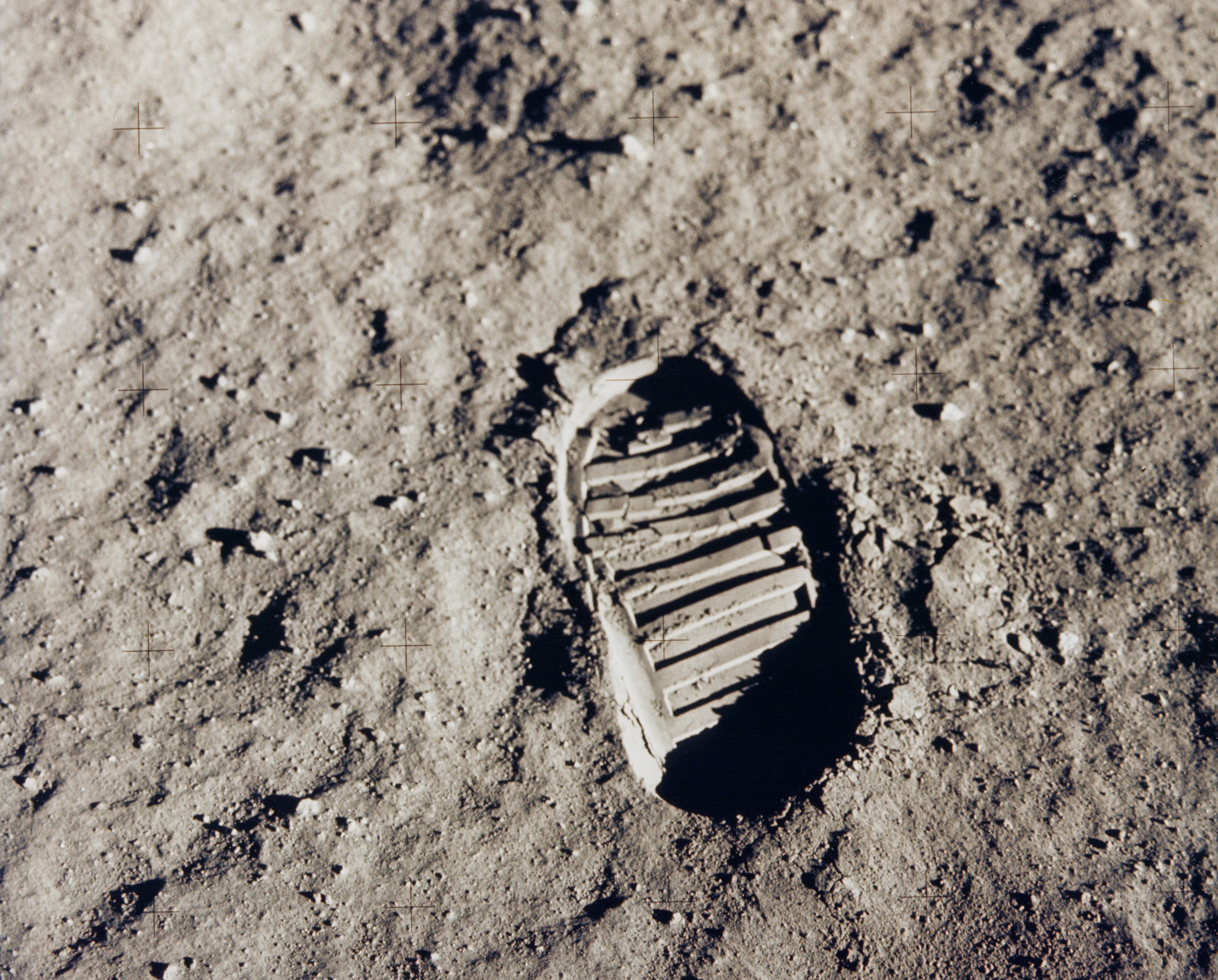
Mars suit's footwear would presumably make direct contact with an extraterrestrial surface; lunar footprint shown.

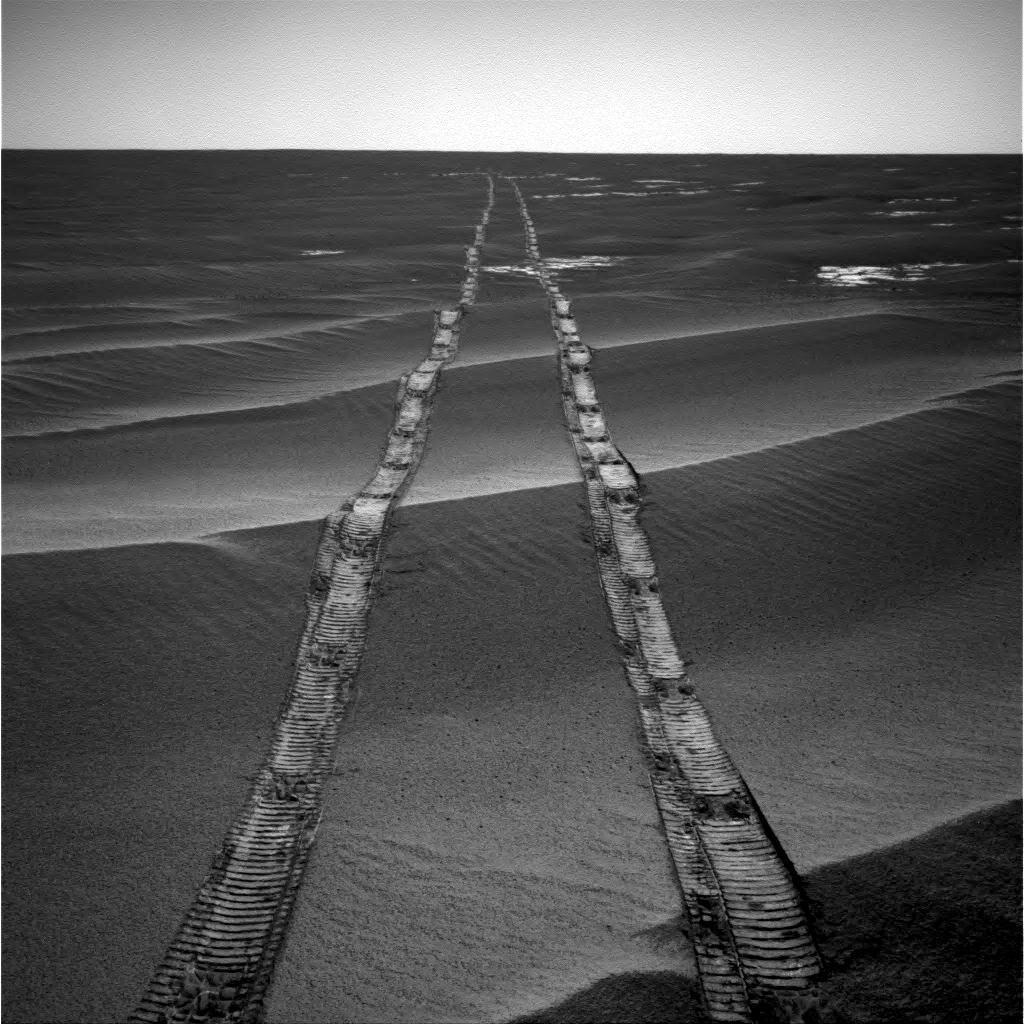
Rover tracks on Mars

One design for a Mars suit from the 2010s, the NASA Z-2 suit, would have electroluminescent patches to help crew members identify one another. Three types of tests planned for the Z-2 include tests in a vacuum chamber, tests in NASA's Neutral Buoyancy Laboratory (a large pool for mimicking zero-g), and tests in a rocky desert area. (See also: Z series space suits.)

The Mars 2020 Perseverance rover has a materials test that is hoped will aid Mars suit development, the SHERLOC experiment; it includes a test target with space suit materials. The test will measure how these suit materials are affected by the Martian environment. Six materials have been chosen for testing: Orthofabric, Teflon, nGimat-coated Teflon, Dacron, Vectran, and Polycarbonate. The test will help select the best materials for future Mars space suits. Orthofabric is a polymeric material composed of a weave of GORE-TEX fibers, Nomex, and Kevlar-29.

NASA tested possible Mars space suit materials by exposing them to Mars-equivalent ultraviolet (UV) radiation for 2500 hours, and then studied how the materials were affected. One of the concerns for the Mars suits is how materials respond to chemically reactive Mars dust and exposure to ultraviolet, especially over the lengths of time and amount of use the suits are expected to function.

One researcher working on a design for Mars surface EVA suits was inspired in part by Medieval armor suits. Some ideas for a Mars suits are a Heads-up display projected in the visor, built-in communications equipment, life support, and a voice-recognition assistant.

Examples of design concerns:

- High-speed winds filled with abrasive Mars dust
- Radiation such as cosmic rays
- Low temperatures down to −130 °C (−202 °F; 143 K)
- Exposure to ultraviolet light

One Mars mission design aspect is whether the Mars suits should also be made to work in space, or should be for the surface only.

=== Designs ===
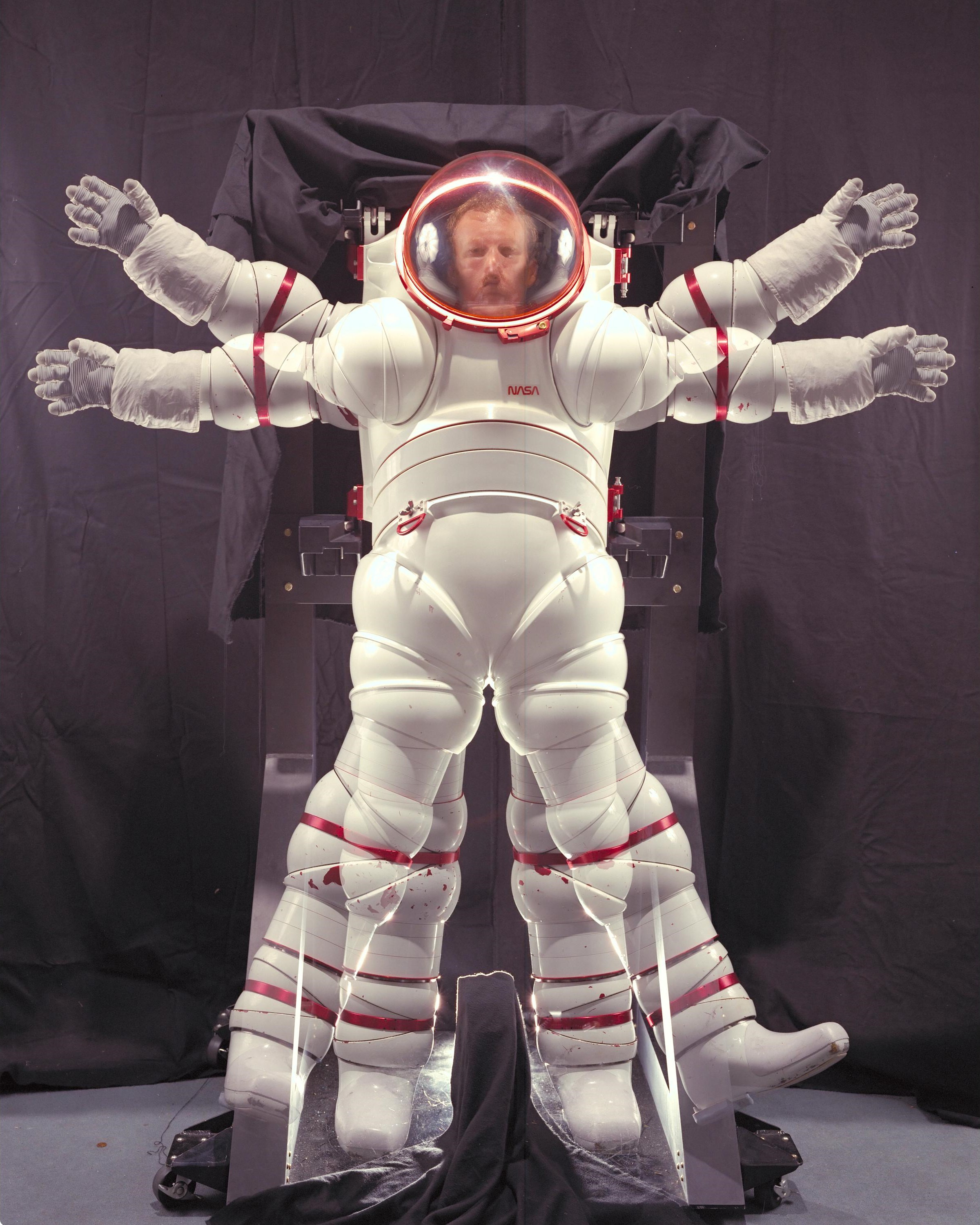
NASA AX-5 hard space suit

The Biosuit is a mechanical counterpressure suit, resulting in a body hugging form. In this type of suit, the pressure would come from the structure and elasticity of the material, whereas with prior space-worn suits the pressure comes from pressurized gas, like a filled balloon. The gas pressure can make a flexible suit very rigid, like an inflated balloon.

The Aoudo suit by the Austrian Space Forum is a space suit simulator for planetary surfaces. The suit ventilates with ambient air, but has a host of features to help simulate a space suit as well as tests enhancing technologies like a heads-up display inside the helmet. The AX-5 was part of a line of hard-suits developed at NASA Ames. Current suits are either soft or hybrid suits and use a lower-pressure pure oxygen atmosphere, which means people going on EVA must pre-breathe oxygen to avoid getting decompression sickness. A hard-suit can use a high-pressure atmosphere, eliminating the need to pre-breathe, but without being too hard to move like a high pressure soft suit would be.

A simulated Mars suit was used for the HI-SEAS Earth-based spaceflight analog tests of the 2010s in Hawaii, USA.

Mars suit design has been used as a topic for technology education.

== Comparison to Apollo lunar suit ==
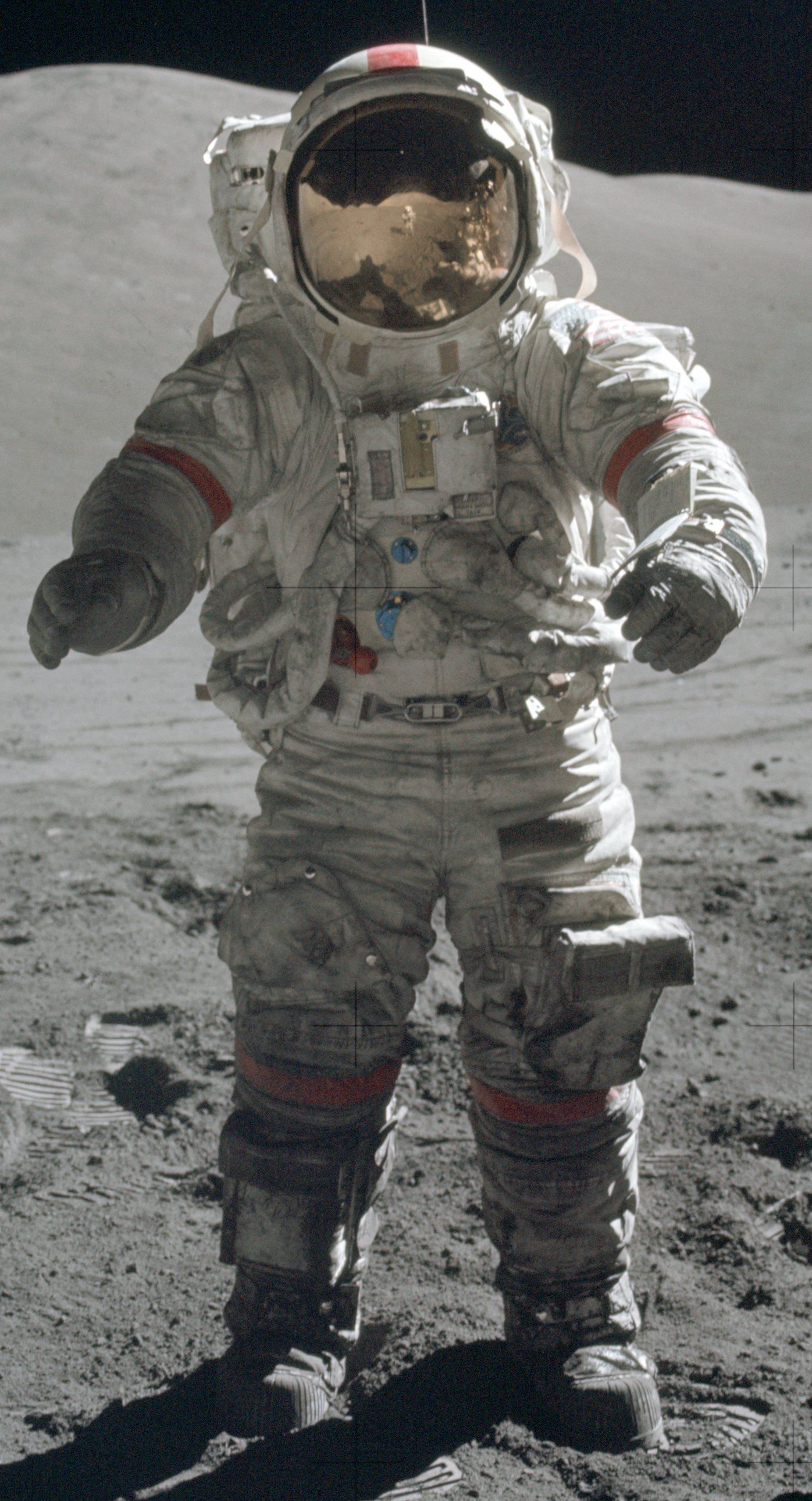
Apollo Extravehicular Mobility Unit (lunar suit), from Apollo 17

The Apollo lunar EVA suit was called the Extravehicular Mobility Unit (EMU). Besides the pressure suit, this included the Portable Life Support System (backpack) and an emergency Oxygen Purge System (OPS) which provided 30 minutes of oxygen for emergency. The combined system weighed 96.2 kilograms (212 lb) on Earth, but only 15.9 kilograms (35.1 lb) on the Moon.

Weights of the components of the Apollo Extravehicular Mobility Unit on different astronomical bodies, given as the equivalent masses on Earth
| | Earth | Moon | Mars |
|---|---|---|---|
| Gravity (relative to Earth's) | 100% | 16.54% | 37.9% |
| Suit | 35 kg (78 lb) | 5.9 kg (12.9 lb) | 13.4 kg (29.6 lb) |
| PLSS | 42 kg (93 lb) | 7.0 kg (15.4 lb) | 16.0 kg (35.2 lb) |
| Oxygen Purge System | 19 kg (41 lb) | 3.1 kg (6.8 lb) | 7.0 kg (15.5 lb) |
| Total | 96 kg (212 lb) | 15.9 kg (35.1 lb) | 36.4 kg (80.3 lb) |

== Environmental design requirements ==
The most critical factors for immediate survivability and comfort on the Martian surface are to provide: sufficient pressure to prevent the boiling of body fluids; supply of oxygen and removal of carbon dioxide and water vapor for breathing; temperature control; and protection from cosmic radiation.

=== Pressure ===
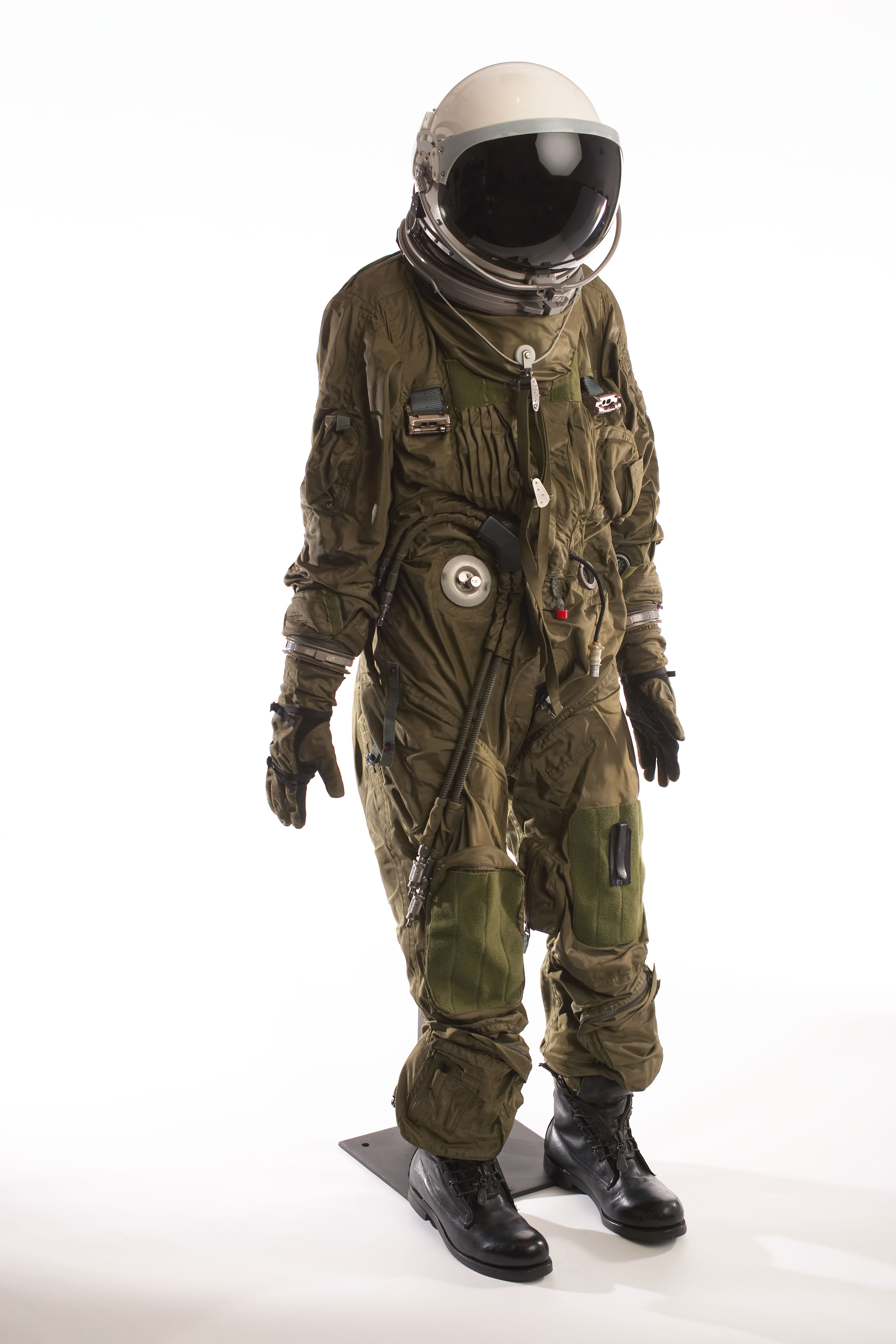
Partial pressure suit for high-altitude flight

The atmospheric pressure on Mars varies with elevation and seasons, but there is not enough pressure to sustain life without a pressure suit. The lowest pressure the human body can tolerate, known as the Armstrong limit, is the pressure at which water boils (vaporizes) at the temperature of a human body, which is about 6.3 kilopascals (0.91 psi). The average surface pressure on Mars has been measured to be only about one-tenth of this, 0.61 kilopascals (0.088 psi). The highest pressure, at the lowest surface elevation, the bottom of Hellas Basin, is 1.24 kilopascals (0.180 psi), about twice the average. There is a seasonal variation over the Martian year (about two Earth years) as carbon dioxide (95.9% of the atmosphere) is sequentially frozen out, then sublimated back into the atmosphere when it is warmer, causing a global 0.2-kilopascal (0.029 psi) rise and fall in pressure.

But the Martian atmosphere contains only 0.13–0.14% oxygen, compared to 20.9% of Earth's atmosphere. Thus breathing the Martian atmosphere is impossible for almost any organism; oxygen must be supplied, at a pressure in excess of the Armstrong limit.

=== Breathing ===
Average composition of the Martian atmosphere

Humans take in oxygen and expel carbon dioxide and water vapor when they breathe, and typically breathe between 12 and 20 times per minute at rest and up to 45 times per minute under high activity. At standard sea level conditions on Earth of 101.33 kilopascals (14.697 psi), humans are breathing in 20.9% oxygen, at a partial pressure of 21.2 kilopascals (3.07 psi). This is the required oxygen supply corresponding to normal Earth conditions. Humans generally require supplemental oxygen at altitudes above 15,000 feet (4.6 km), so the absolute minimum safe oxygen requirement is a partial pressure of 11.94 kilopascals (1.732 psi) For reference, the Apollo EMU used an operating pressure of 25.5 kilopascals (3.70 psi) on the Moon.

Exhaled breath on Earth normally contains about 4% carbon dioxide and 16% oxygen, along with 78% nitrogen, plus about 0.2 to 0.3 liters of water. Carbon dioxide slowly becomes increasingly toxic in high concentrations, and must be scrubbed from the breathing gas. A concept to scrub carbon dioxide from breathing air is to use re-usable amine bead carbon dioxide scrubbers. While one carbon dioxide scrubber filters the astronaut's air, the other can vent scrubbed carbon dioxide to the Mars atmosphere. Once that process is completed, another scrubber can be used, and the one that was used can take a break. Another more traditional way to remove carbon dioxide from air is by a lithium hydroxide canister, but these need to be replaced periodically. Carbon dioxide removal systems are a standard part of habitable spacecraft designs, although their specifics vary. One idea to remove carbon dioxide is to use a zeolite molecular sieve, and then later the carbon dioxide can be removed from the material.

If nitrogen is used to increase pressure as on the ISS, it is inert to humans, but can cause decompression sickness. Space suits typically operate at low pressure to make their balloon-like structure easier to move, so astronauts must spend a long time getting the nitrogen out of their system. The Apollo missions used a pure oxygen atmosphere in space except on the ground, to reduce risk of fire. There is also interest in hard suits that can handle higher internal pressures but are more flexible, so astronauts do not have to get the nitrogen out of their system before going on a spacewalk.

=== Temperature ===
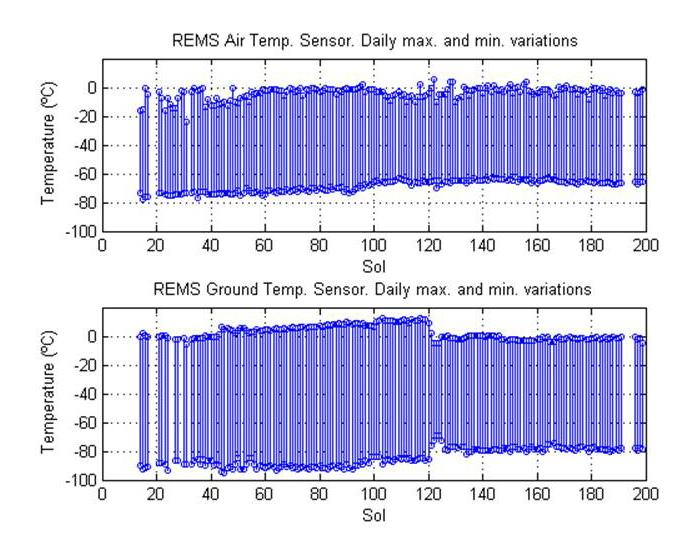
A graph of Mars surface temperature data from a Mars surface probe (rover)

There can be large temperature swings on Mars; for example, at the equator, daytime temperature may reach 21 °C (70 °F) in the Martian summer, and drop down to −73 °C (−100 °F) at night. According to a 1958 NASA report, long-term human comfort requires temperatures in the 4 to 35 °C (40 to 95 °F) range at 50% humidity.

=== Radiation ===
On Earth, in developed nations, humans are exposed to about 0.6 rads (6 mGy) per year, and aboard the International Space Station about 8 rads (80 mGy) per year. Humans can tolerate up to about 200 rads (2 Gy) of radiation without incurring permanent damage; however, any radiation exposure carries risk so there is a focus on keeping exposure as low as possible. On the surface of Mars there are two main types of radiation: A steady dose from a variety of sources and solar proton events that can cause a dramatic increase in the amount of radiation for a short time. Solar flare events can cause a lethal dose to be delivered in hours if astronauts are caught unprotected, and this is a concern of NASA for human operations in space and on the surface of Mars. Mars does not have a large magnetic field in the same way as Earth, which shields the Earth from radiation, especially from solar flares. For example, the solar event which occurred on August 7, 1972, just 5 months after Apollo 16, produced so much radiation, including a wave of accelerated particles like protons, that NASA became concerned what would happen if such an event were to occur while astronauts were in space. If the astronauts get too much radiation, it increases their lifetime cancer risk and they can get radiation poisoning. Exposure to ionizing radiation can also cause cataracts, a problem with the eye.

The atmosphere of Mars is much thinner than Earth's, so it does not stop as much radiation.

The effect of radiation on medications taken on the mission is also of concern, especially if it alters their medical qualities.

== Additional design requirements ==
Operating in Mars suit on the surface creates a series of concerns for the human body, including an altered gravitational environment, a confined and isolated situation, a hostile exterior environment and closed environment inside, radiation, and extreme distance from Earth.

An important consideration for the breathing air inside the suit, is that toxic gases do not get into the air supply. Reduced gravity environments can alter the distribution of fluids inside the body. One point of concern is changes in fine motor skill, especially if it interferes with the ability to use computer interfaces.

=== Visors and UV ===
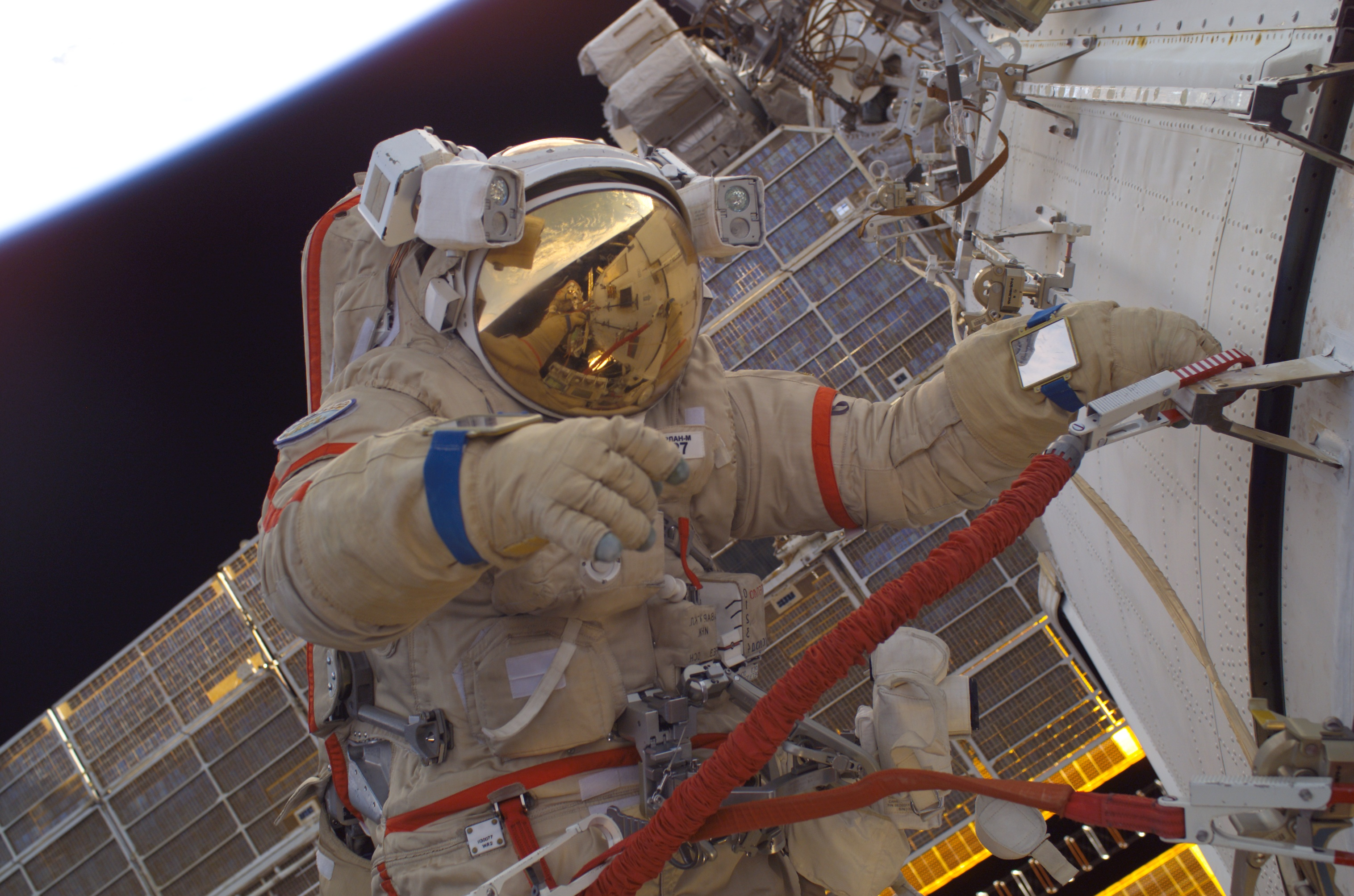
A gold-coated visor is deployed during this astronaut's EVA in Earth orbit.

A thin layer of gold on the visor plastic bubble of current space helmets shields the face from harmful parts of the Sun's spectrum. Visor designs, in general, have a design goal of allowing the astronaut to see, but block ultraviolet and heat, besides the pressure requirements.

It has been detected that ultraviolet light does reach the surface of Mars. Martian carbon dioxide tends to block ultraviolet light of wavelengths shorter than about 190 nm; however, above that there is less blocking depending on the amount of dust and Rayleigh scattering. Significant amounts of UVB and UVC light are noted to reach the surface of Mars.

=== Toilet and vomiting ===
A human consideration for suits is the need to eliminate bodily waste. Various methods have been employed in suits, and in the Shuttle-era NASA used maximum absorbency garments to enable stays of 10 hours in space and partial pressure suits.

Another concern is vomiting, which has increased occurrence in spaceflight.

=== Martian dust ===
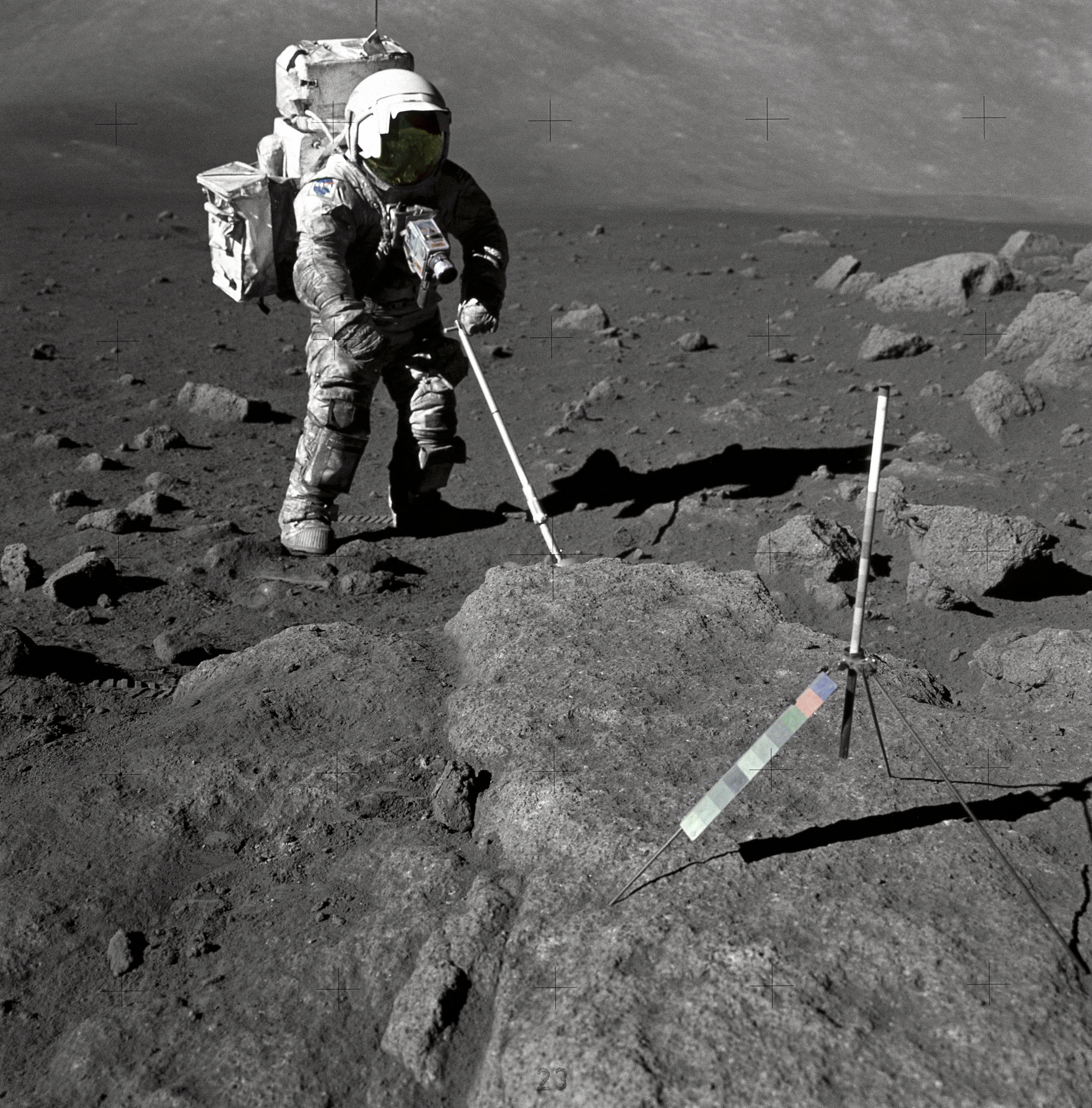
The Apollo Moon suit became covered in lunar regolith dust during moonwalks.

Another consideration is what would happen if astronauts somehow breathe in Mars dust. The health effect of Mars dust is a concern, based on known information about it which includes that it may be abrasive and/or reactive. Studies have been done with quartz dust and also compared it to lunar dust exposure. An Apollo 17 astronaut complained of hay fever like symptoms after his Moon walk. The lunar dust was known to cling to the space suits and be taken in with the astronauts when they came in to the Apollo Lunar Module.

== Use ==
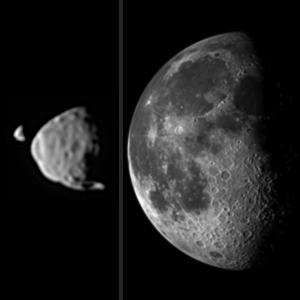
The relative sizes of Deimos and Phobos as might be seen from the surface of Mars, compared to the relative size in the sky of the Moon as seen from Earth. Depending on the condition, a night time EVA would mean seeing the Martian moons in the night sky at Mars.

An article in the magazine Nature noted that due to the reduced gravity, the dynamics of walking on Mars would be different than on Earth. This is because people fall forward as part of their gait when moving, the motion of the center of body mass resembling that of an inverted pendulum. Compared to the Earth, all else being equal it would be half the amount of work to move, but a walking speed on Mars would be 3.4 km per hour rather than 5.5 km per hour on Earth. This data was produced by simulating Martian gravity for the duration of an aircraft following a flight profile that causes this type of acceleration. The acceleration of gravity at the surface of Mars is calculated to be about 3.7 meters per second^{2}. It is not known if this reduced gravity causes the same kind of reduced muscle mass and biological effects as seen when living in microgravity aboard the ISS for several months. The gravity is about 38% of Earth's gravity at the surface.

Rock climbing tests with a low-pressure IVA (intra vehicle activity) suit were conducted in Oregon, USA. The difficulty of grasping rock with gloves including moving fingers and gaining friction with rocks was noted, and ice climbing axes were helpful for climbing surfaces. Mountaineering on Mars may be needed when the terrain environments exceeds the abilities of a rover vehicle, or to access a target of interest, or simply to get home to a base. One common mountaineering need is a highly mobile short-stay shelter to use for overnight stays when climbing, such as a tent, and an equivalent for Mars might support the ability to get out of a space suit. Suit design for climbing would likely be impacted by the needs for climbing including suit flexibility, especially in the hands and also in terms of durability.

Another issue is the expected amount of use for the suits in probably human mission designs. For example, as of the late 2010s there had been over 500 EVA's from the start of spaceflight, whereas a single mission to Mars is expected to need 1000 EVAs.

Typical Mars mission plans note that a person wearing a Mars suit would need to enter a pressurized rover through an airlock. Alternatively, a Mars suit would need to be worn on crewed unpressurized rovers to provide life support. There are several different options for an egress and entry airlock for a space suit, one of which is to repressurize the entire compartment as on the Apollo lunar lander. Some other ideas are suitport, crewlock, and transit airlock.

Mars suits used in conjunction with other surface elements on Mars (artwork)

== Need ==
The NASA Authorization Act of 2017 directed NASA to get humans near or on the surface of Mars by the early 2030s.

== Suitport for Mars ==
Mars space suits have been explored for integration with airlock design that combines an airlock and suit entry and egress with another vehicle, and is commonly known as a suitport. This has been considered as a way to integrate a crewed pressurized Mars rover with Mars space suit EVAs.

The idea is that a person would slide into the suit through an airlock opening while the exterior of suit is outside the vehicle and exposed to the Martian environment. Then, the hatch would be closed, sealing off the interior of the vehicle, and the person would be supported by the suit's life support system. NASA tested the Z-1 space suit for extraterrestrial surface EVA with a suitport design in the 2010s. In the NASA Z-1 design there is a hatch at the rear of the space suit that can be docked with a suitable vehicle or structure.

== Gallery ==
Visions of Mars EVA

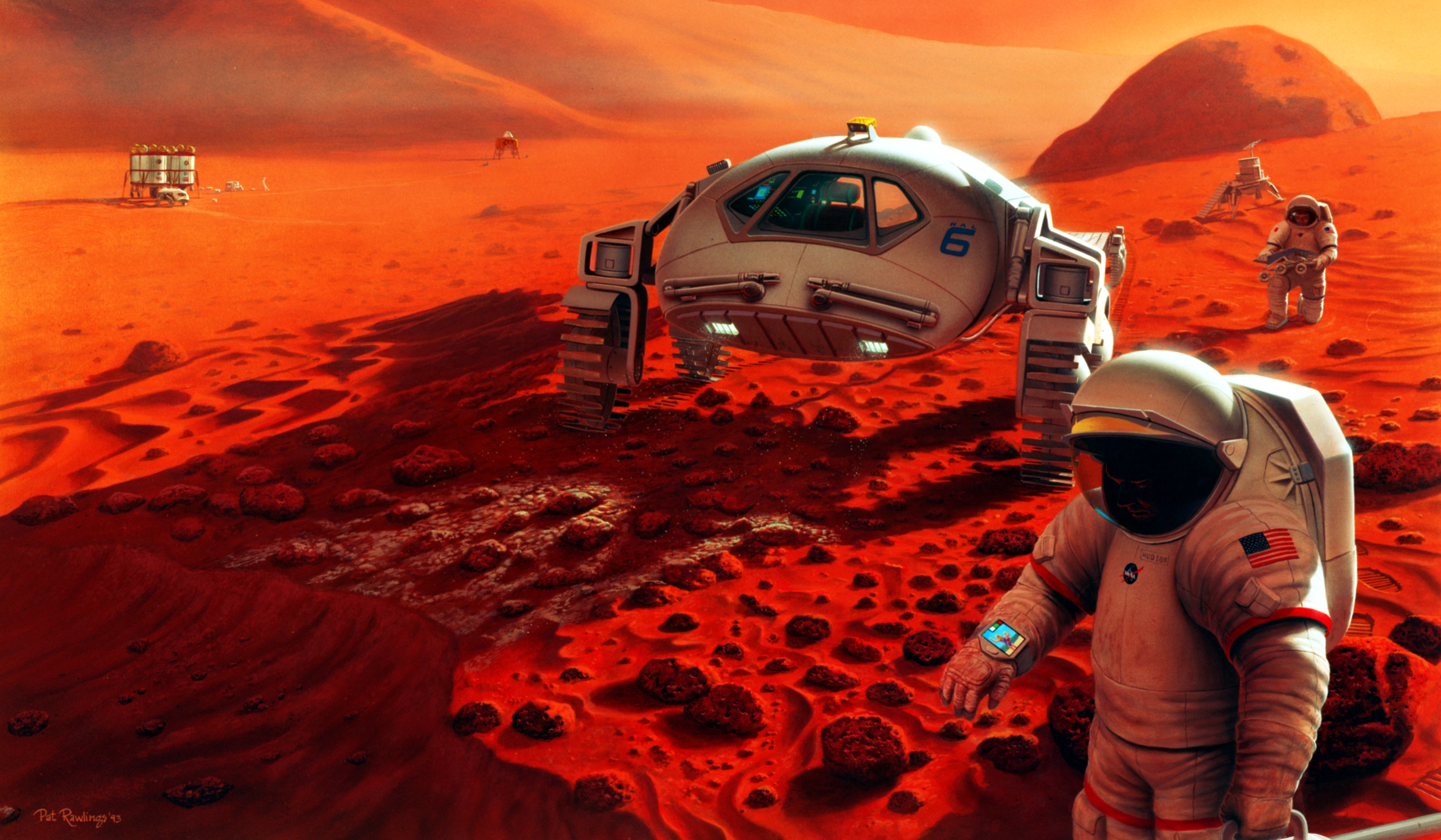
Human Mars mission designs usually include Mars EVA suits. In this vision, people in suits in combination with crewed rovers and other equipment maneuver on the Martian surface. Mission enhancing technologies to give astronauts an edge are often explored, such as a wrist mounted video display.

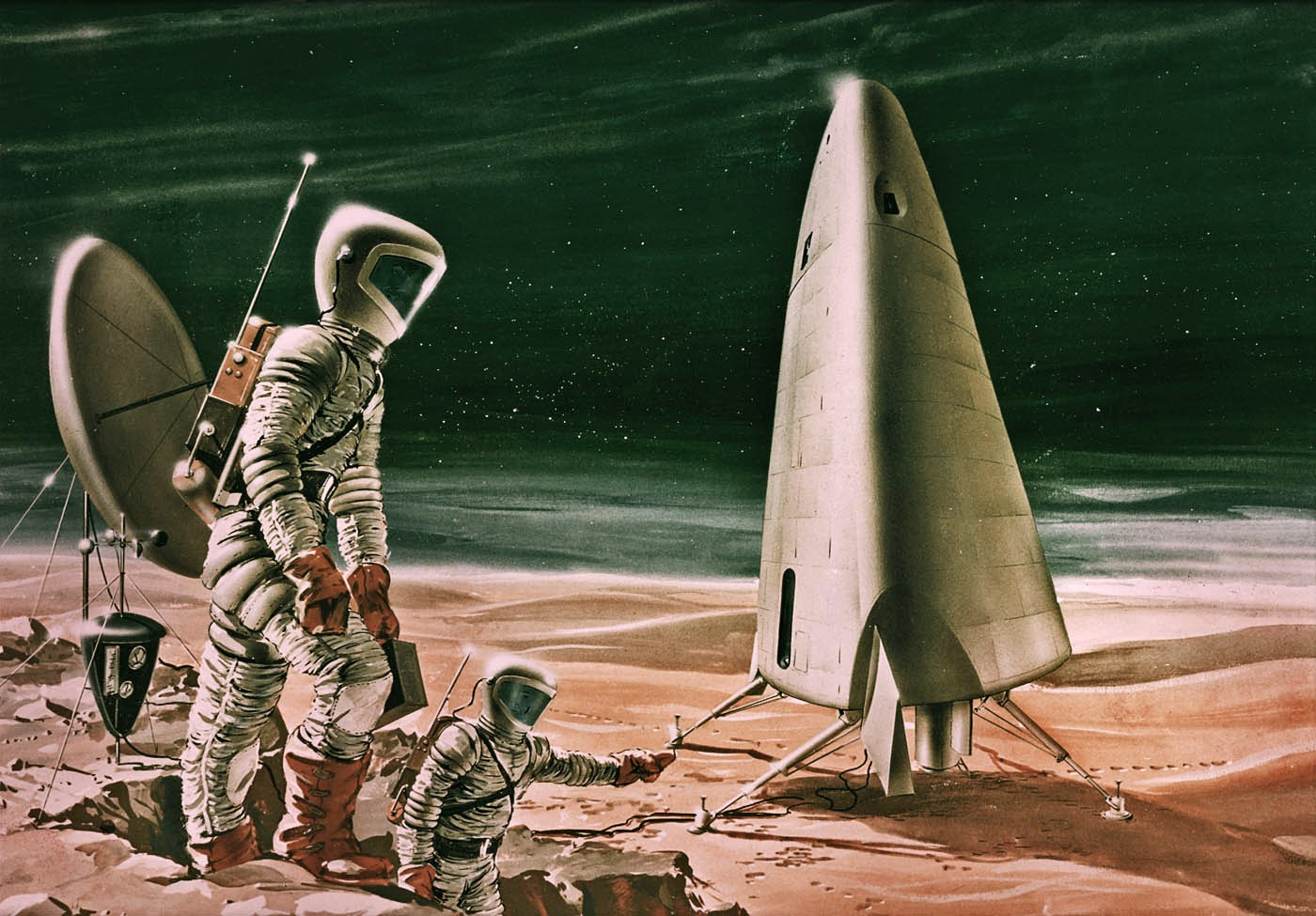
Artist's conception of a crew going on surface EVA on Mars, circa early 1960s. In the background is a Mars Excursion Module (MEM).

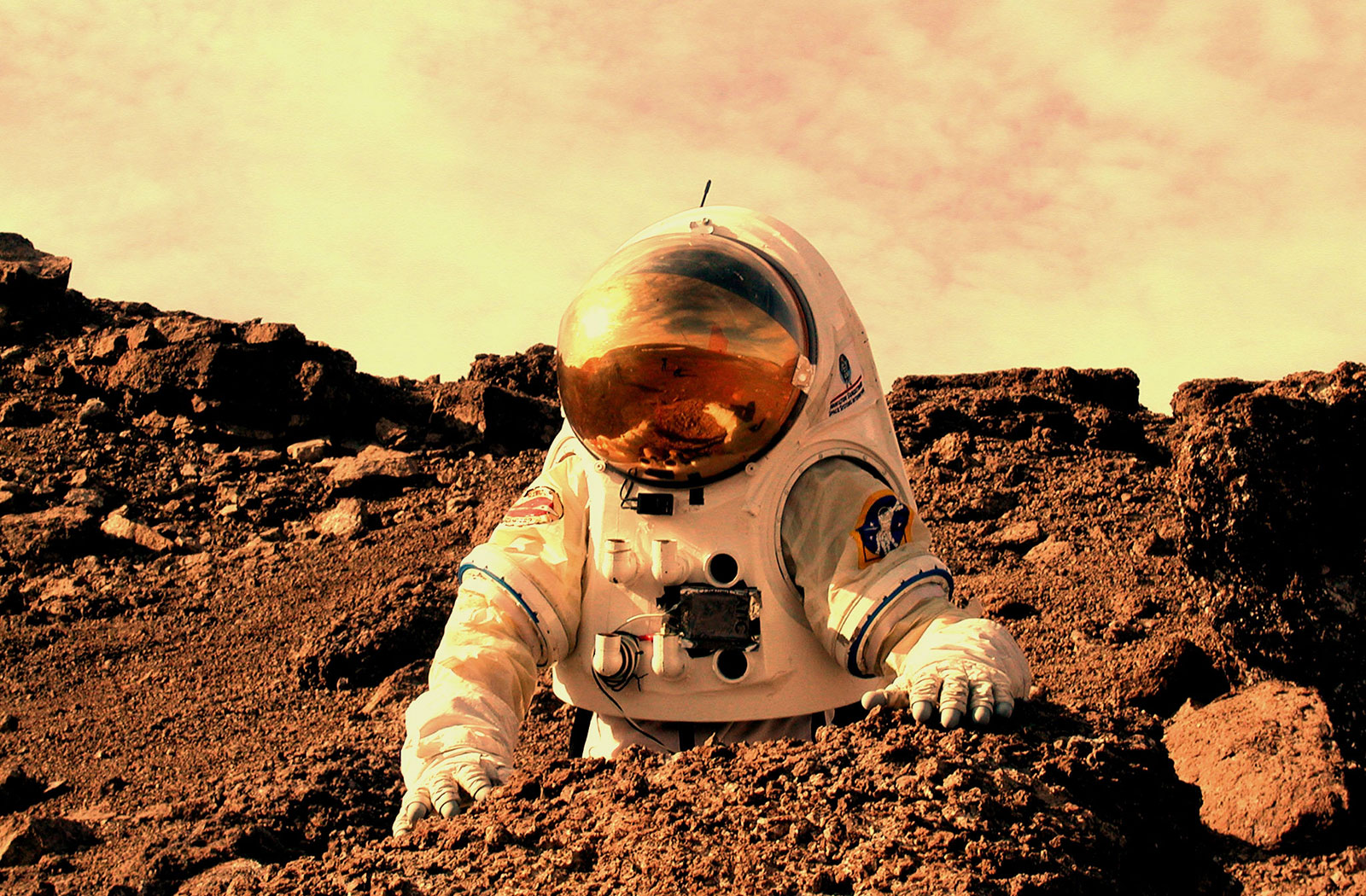
Staged photosimulation art of Martian space suit on EVA (NASA, 2010s)

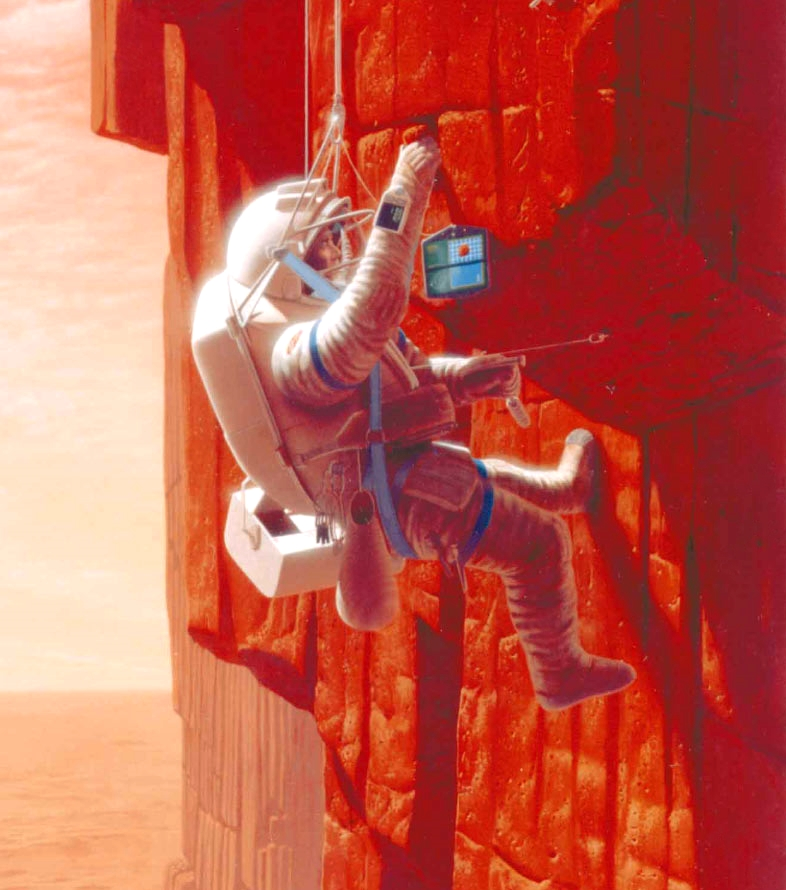
Rock climbing on Mars

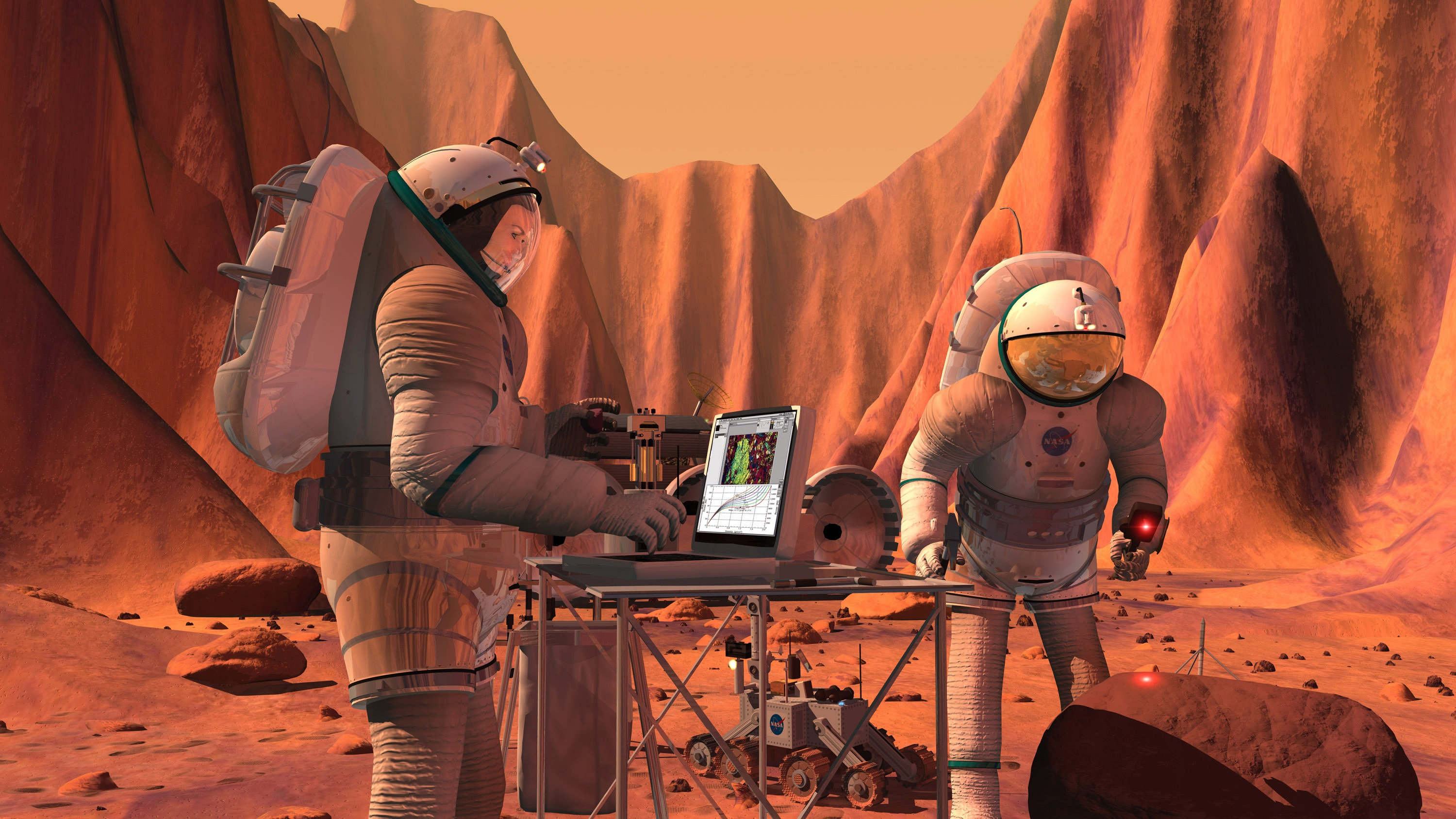
NASA concept of Mars-crew analyzing a sample (2004).

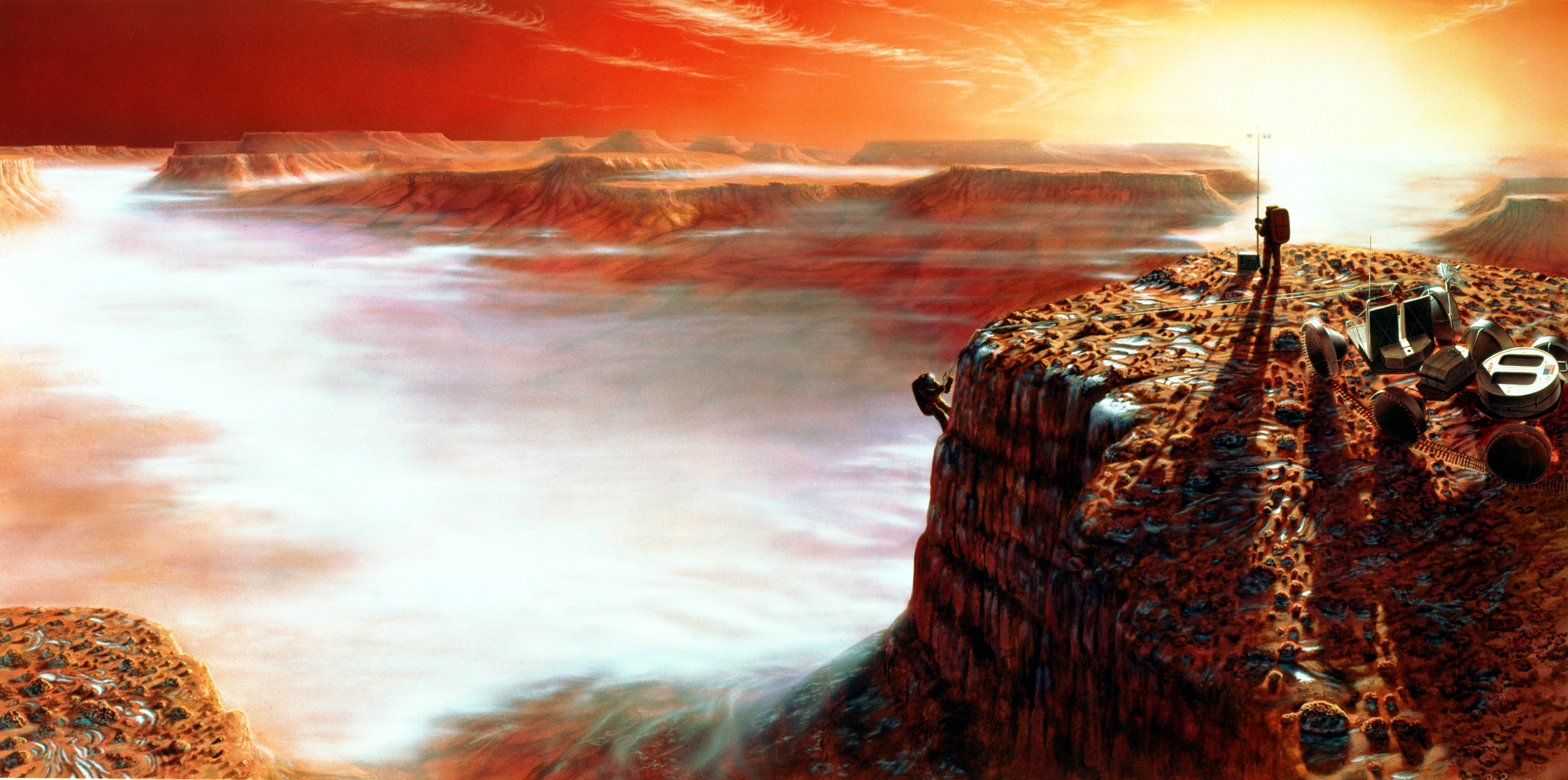
The first human Mars explorers survey Valles Marineris at sunrise (1989)

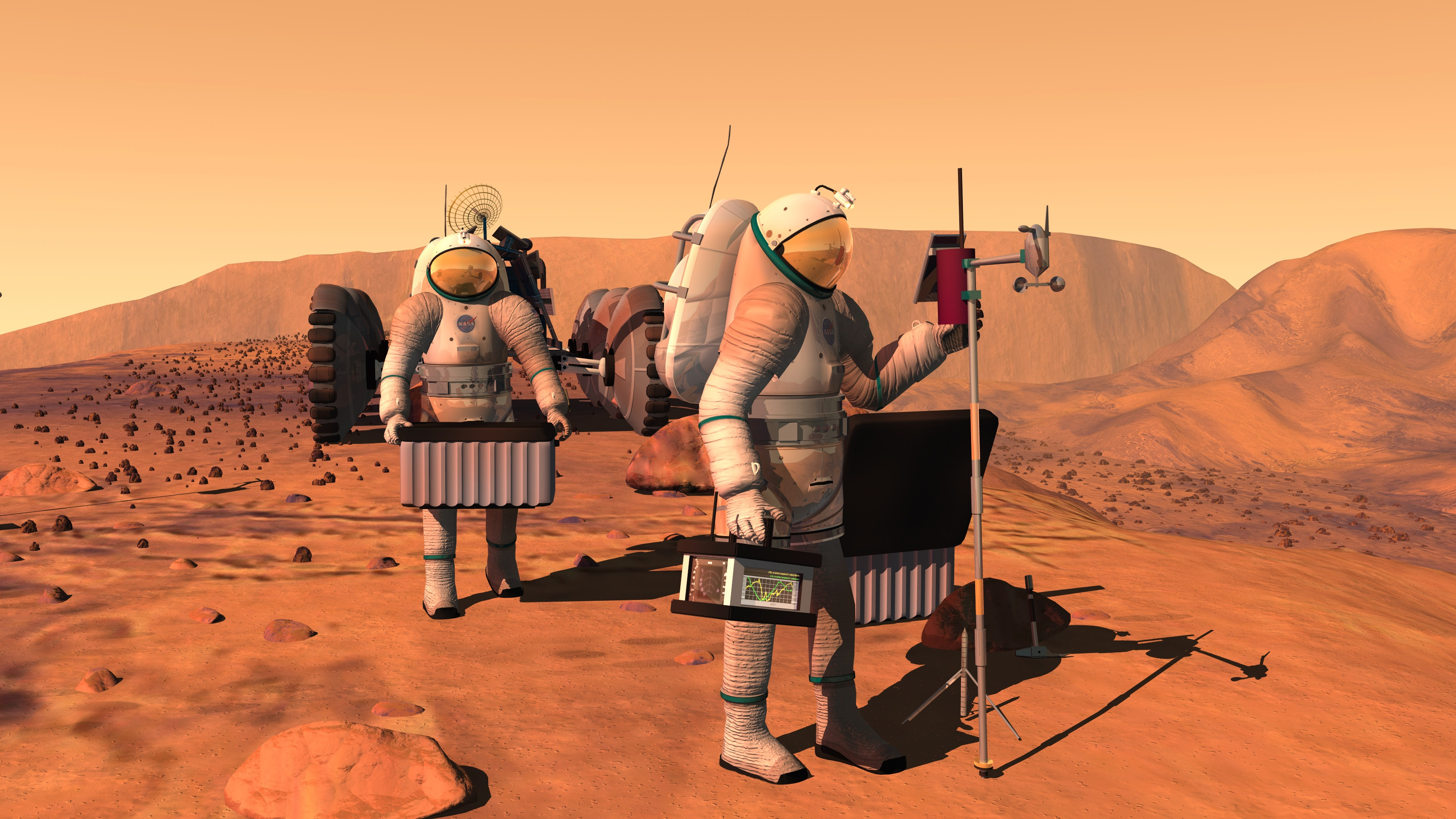
Concept art by NASA of two people in suits on Mars setting up weather equipment

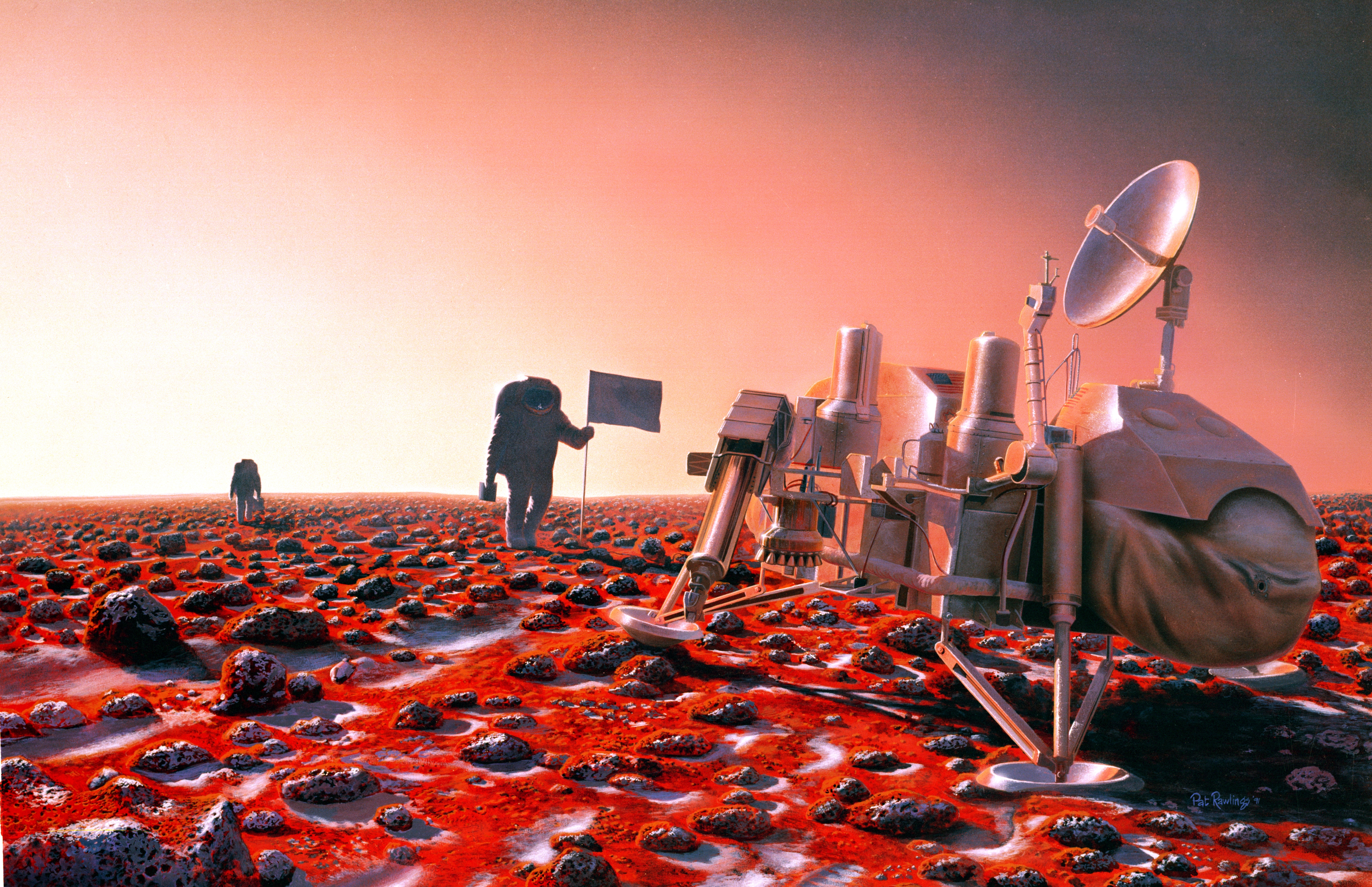
Space art showing astronauts in Mars space suits approaching the Viking 2 Mars lander

== See also ==
- Crewed Mars rover
- Mars habitat
- List of missions to Mars
- Locomotion in space
