= Airlock =

Compartment for transfer between environments with different atmospheres

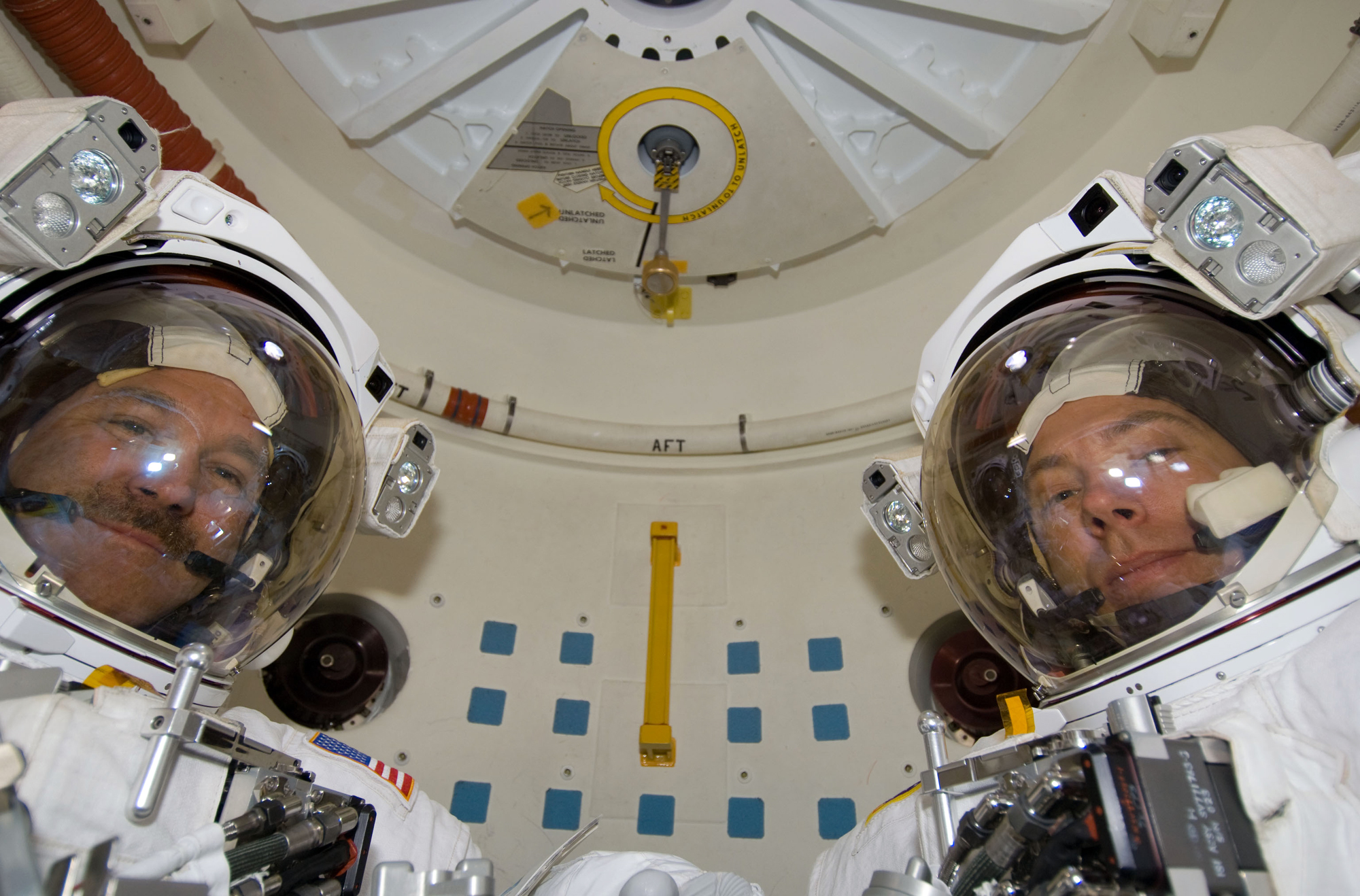
An airlock on board Space Shuttle Atlantis

An airlock (Note: "Airlock" is sometimes written as air-lock or air lock (or even just lock); while all are acceptable, "airlock" is the most common and preferred spelling.) is a room or compartment which permits passage between environments of differing atmospheric pressure or composition, while minimizing the changing of pressure or composition between the differing environments.

An airlock consists of a chamber with two airtight doors or openings, usually arranged in series, which do not open simultaneously. Airlocks can be small-scale mechanisms, such as those used in fermenting, or larger mechanisms, which often take the form of an antechamber.

An airlock may also be used underwater to allow passage between the air environment in a pressure vessel, such as a submarine, and the water environment outside. In such cases the airlock can contain either air or water. This is called a floodable airlock or underwater airlock, and is used to prevent water from entering a submersible vessel or underwater habitat.

== Operation ==
The procedure of entering an airlock from the external or ambient pressure environment, sealing it, equalizing the pressure, and passing through the inner door is known as locking in. Conversely, locking out involves equalizing pressure, unsealing the outer door, then exiting the lock compartment to enter the ambient environment. Locking on and off refer to transfer under pressure where the two chambers are physically connected or disconnected prior to equalizing the pressure and locking in or out.

Before opening either door, the air pressure of the airlock chamber is equalized with that of the environment beyond the next door. A gradual pressure transition minimizes air temperature fluctuations, which helps reduce fogging and condensation, decreases stresses on air seals, and allows safe verification of critical equipment.

When a person who is not in a pressure suit moves between environments of greatly different pressures, an airlock changes the pressure slowly to help with internal air cavity equalization and to prevent decompression sickness. This is critical in underwater diving, and a diver or compressed air worker may have to wait in an airlock for a number of hours in accordance with a decompression schedule. A similar arrangement may be used for access to airtight clean spaces, contaminated spaces, or unbreathable atmospheres, which may not necessarily involve any differences in pressure; in these cases, a decontamination procedure and flushing are used instead of pressure change procedures.

== History and research ==
=== 19th century ===
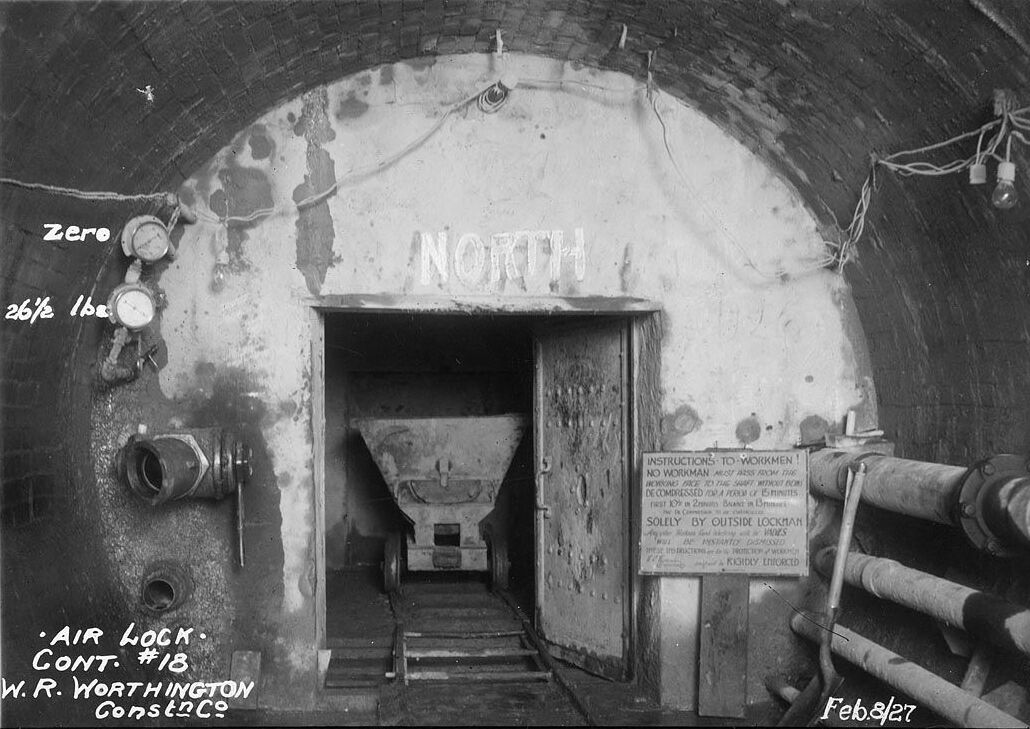
An early airlock, with decompression instructions

The first airlock patent was granted in 1830 to Thomas Cochrane, who came up with the idea to help facilitate underground tunnel construction. It was put into use in 1879 during an attempt to dig a tunnel under the Hudson river.

=== 20th century ===
The Apollo program involved developments in airlock technology, as airlocks are critical to allow humans to enter and exit the spacecraft while on the Moon without losing too much air due to its scant atmosphere.

During the 1969 Apollo 11 mission, there was no room that was primarily designed to be an airlock; instead, they used the cabin as an airlock. It had to be evacuated and depressurized before the door was opened, and then once the door was closed it had to be re-pressurized again before anyone could safely reenter the cabin without a space suit.

In 1989 the Kvant-2 module, which included an airlock, was added to the Mir space station being assembled by the Soviet Union. Prior spacewalks from Salyut space stations were conducted without dedicated airlocks.

=== 21st century ===
When the International Space Station (ISS) first began to house humans in November 2000, it did not include an airlock, and all extravehicular activity had to be facilitated by the airlock on the Space Shuttle until the Quest Joint Airlock module was installed in July 2001.

The first ever commercial space airlock was the Nanoracks Bishop Airlock, installed on the ISS in December 2020. It is "bell-shaped" and is designed to transfer payloads out from the ISS interior and into space. As of July 2023 it is the largest airlock of its kind on the station, capable of fitting "payloads as large as a refrigerator."

== Air environments ==
Airlocks are used in air-to-air environments for a variety of reasons, most of which center around either preventing airborne contaminants from entering or exiting an area, or maintaining the air pressure of the interior chamber.

One common use of airlock technology can be found in some cleanrooms, where harmful or otherwise undesired particulates can be excluded by using positive pressure, i.e. maintaining the room at a higher pressure than the surroundings, alongside other measures. Conversely, particulates are prevented from escaping hazardous environments, such as nuclear reactors, laboratories of biochemistry, and medical centers, by keeping negative room pressure - maintaining the room at a lower pressure than the surroundings, so that air (and any particulates that it carries) cannot escape easily.

A lesser-known application of an airlock is in architecture: inflatable buildings and air-supported structures such as pressurized domes require the internal air pressure to be maintained within a specific range so that the structure doesn't collapse. Airlocks are generally the most cost-efficient way to allow people to enter and exit these structures.

Airlocks are utilized to maintain electron microscope interiors at near-vacuum so that air does not affect the electron path. Fermentation locks, such as those used in alcohol brewing, are a type of airlock which allow gases to escape the fermentation vessel while keeping air out. Parachute airlocks are necessary because airfoil collapse due to depressurization can result in dangerous loss of altitude.

Since the 1980s, airlock technology has been used to explore newly detected chambers in the Egyptian pyramids, to prevent the contents from beginning to decompose due to air contamination.

== Underground ==
Civil engineering projects that use air pressure to keep water and mud out of the workplace use an airlock to transfer personnel, equipment, and materials between the external normabaric environment and the pressurized workplace in a caisson or sealed tunnel. The airlock may need to be large enough to accommodate a whole working shift at the same time.

Locking in is usually a quick procedure, taking only a few minutes, while the decompression required for locking out may take hours.

== Underwater ==
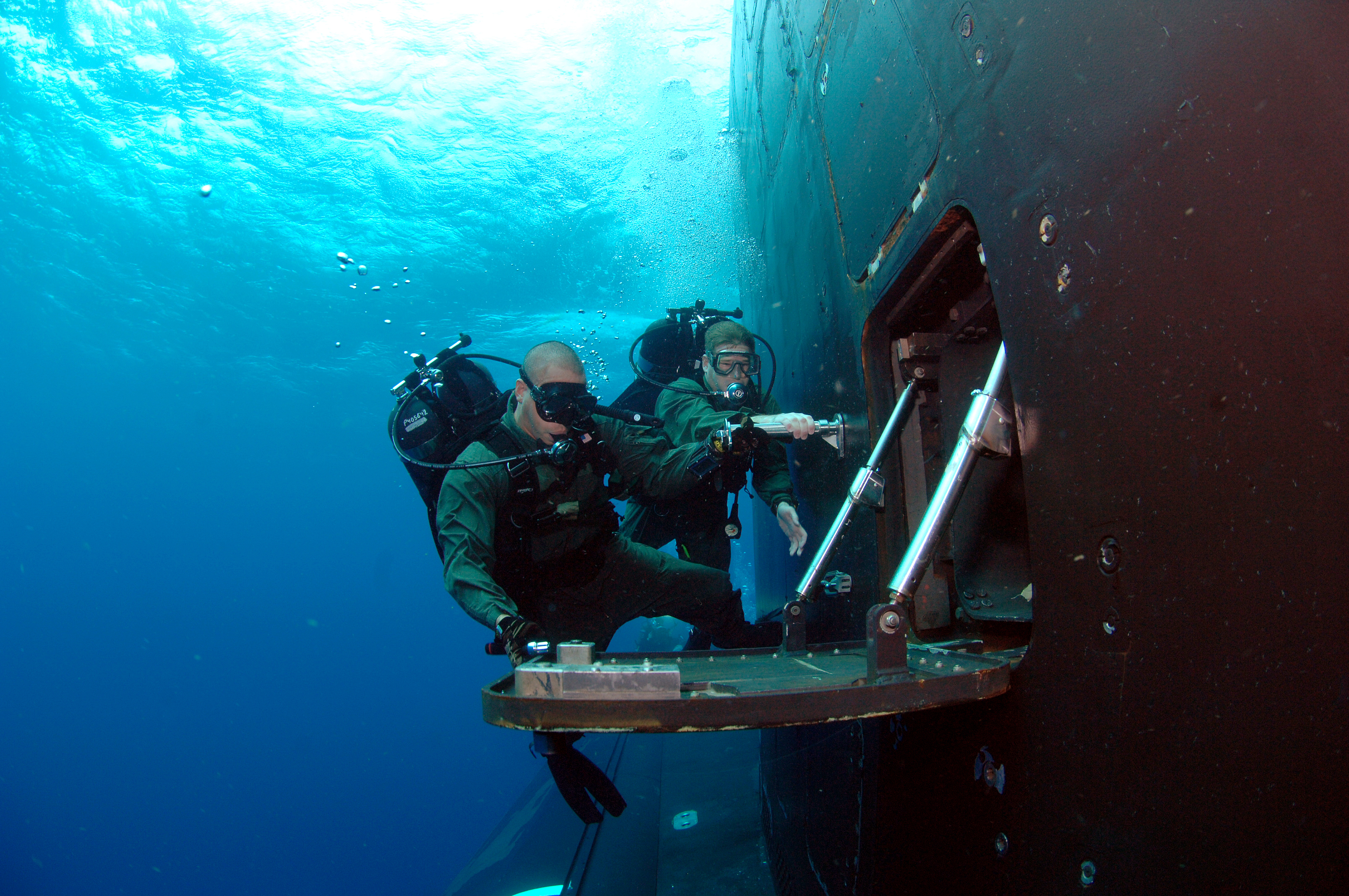
US Navy submarine diving lock out

Underwater applications include:

- Hyperbaric chambers, to allow entry and exit while maintaining pressure difference between chamber and environment;
- Submarines, closed diving bells, and underwater habitats that are not at ambient pressure, to permit divers to enter and exit. In submarines and underwater habitats they may also be called diver lock-out compartments; and
- Torpedo tubes and escape trunks in submarines.

=== Saturation diving ===
In saturation diving, airlocks are crucial safety elements; they serve as pressurized gateways to safely manage the transfer of divers and support personnel between the saturation system (living quarters) and the diving bell, which shuttles divers to their underwater worksite.

Airlocks in saturation diving are equipped with safety features such as pressure gauges, manual overrides, and interlocks.

Saturation systems typically feature a variety of airlocks, including a stores lock for the transfer of supplies and a medical lock for secure passage of medical necessities or emergency evacuations. Complex "split-level" systems, which house divers at different pressure levels for varied work depths, may necessitate additional airlocks.

Decompression post-dive is a gradual process, often taking a full week. During this time, the airlocks allow divers to shift to a decompression chamber where pressure is progressively reduced back to surface levels. In emergencies, airlocks can facilitate transfer to a hyperbaric escape chamber or lifeboat without significant pressure changes.

=== Hyperbaric treatment chambers ===
In any hyperbaric treatment chamber capable of accommodating more than one person, and where it may be necessary to get a person or equipment into or out of the chamber while it is pressurized, an airlock is used. There will usually be a large airlock at the chamber entry capable of holding one or more persons, and a smaller medical lock for locking in medical supplies and food, and locking out waste.

== Outer space ==
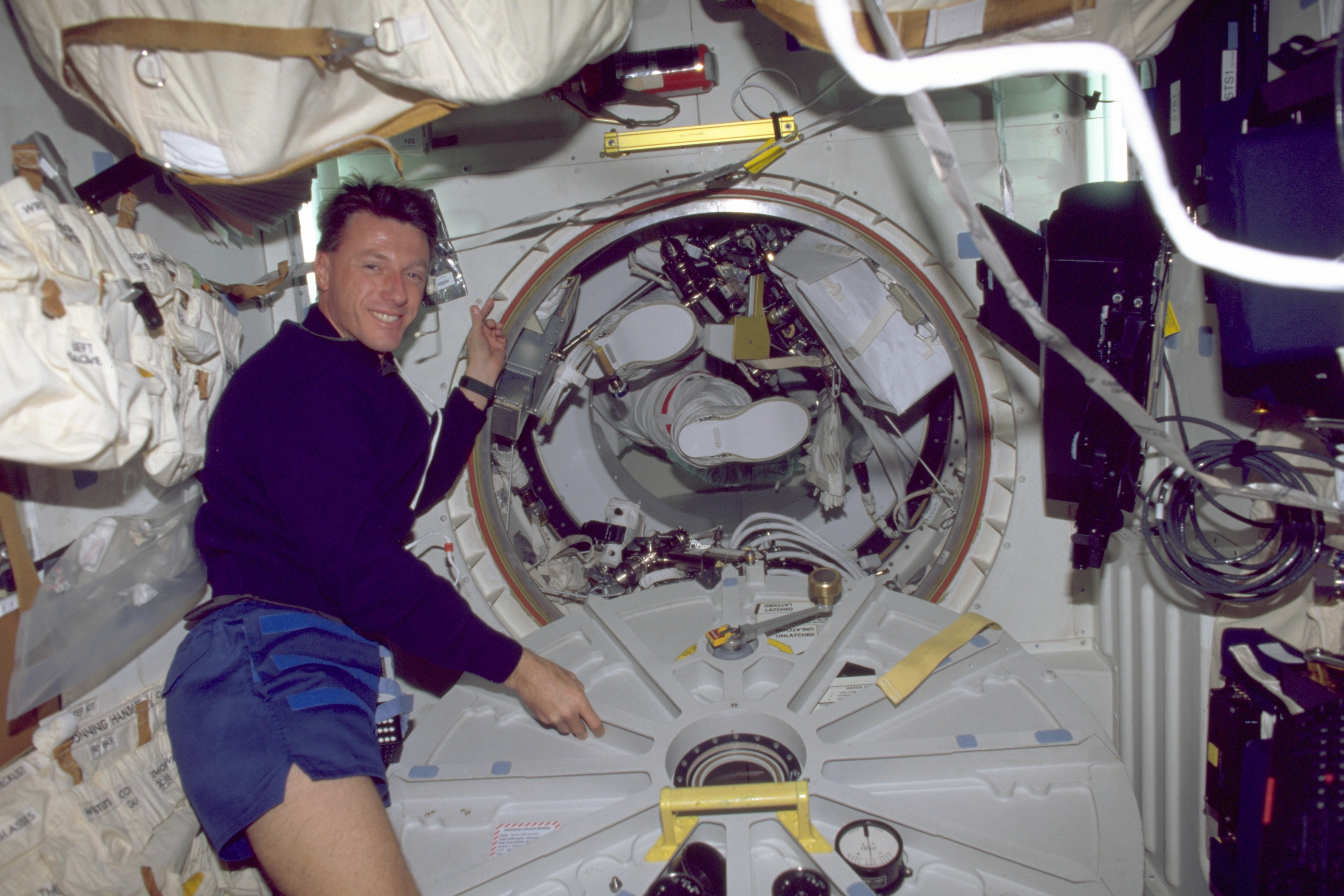
STS-103 closing the airlock

Airlocks are used in outer space, especially during human spaceflight, to maintain the internal habitable environment on spacecraft and space stations when persons are exiting or entering the spacecraft. Without an airlock (or similar technology, such as a suitport) the air inside would be rapidly lost upon opening the door due to the expansive properties of the gases that comprise breathable air, as described by Boyle's law. An airlock room is needed to decompress astronauts after they suit up in specialized space suits in preparation for extravehicular activity, and then to recompress them upon return. Airlocks such as the Nanoracks Bishop Airlock also allow payloads to be released into space with minimal air loss.

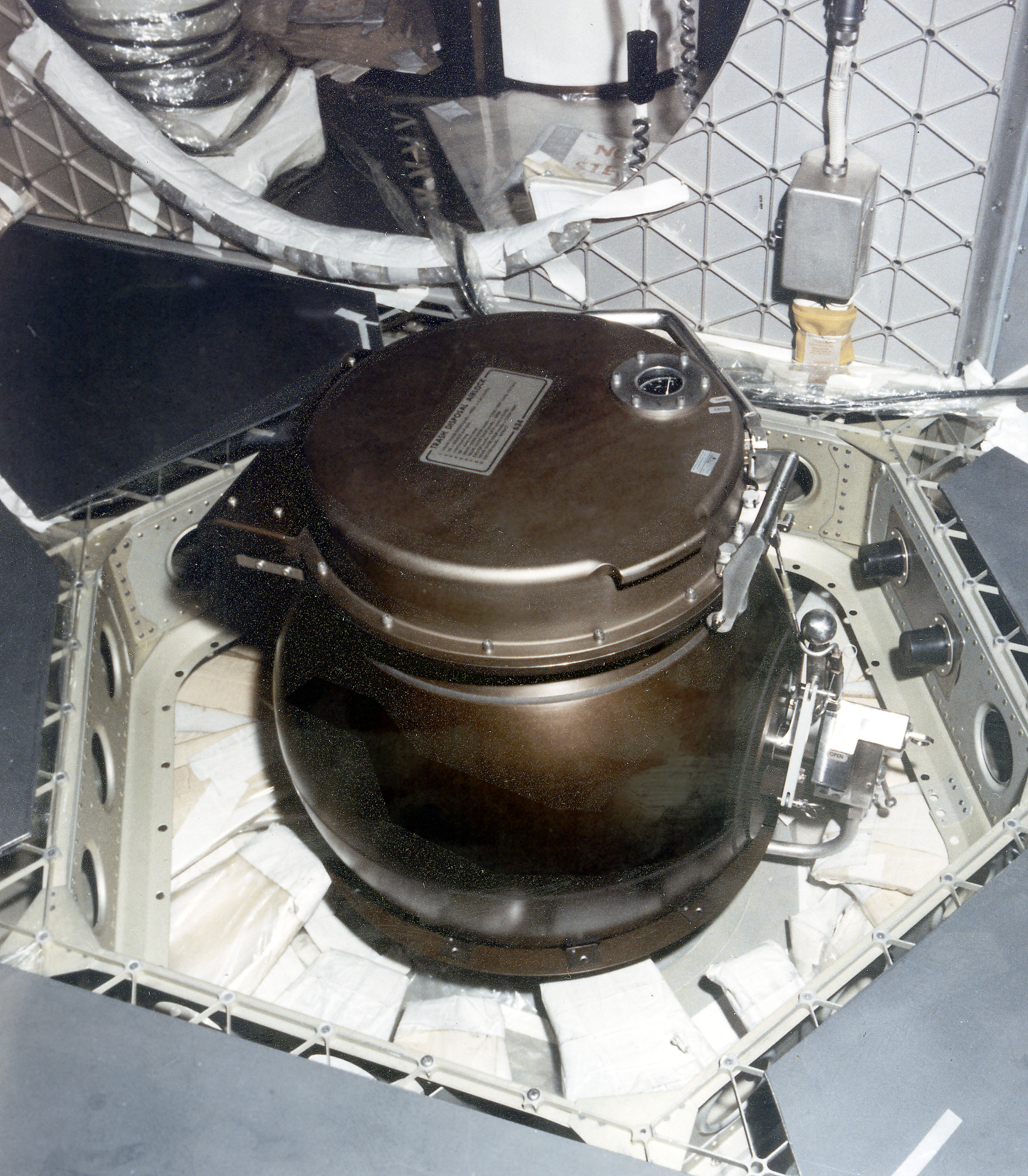
Skylab orbital workshop trash disposal airlock

The Skylab orbital workshop included a manually operated trash disposal airlock to transfer trash from the pressurized habitable compartment to the unpressurized waste tank.

Other examples of airlocks currently used in space include the Quest Joint Airlock and the airlock on Kibō (ISS module).

Spartan Space and Airbus have an airlock design with features specifically addressing use on the lunar surface, including dust mitigation.

== See also ==
- Cabin pressurization – Process to maintain internal air pressure in aircraft or spacecraft
- Dysbarism – Medical conditions resulting from changes in ambient pressure
- Mechanisms with similar functions:
  - Lock (water navigation) – Uses water levels instead of air
  - Mantrap (access control) – Physical security access control system
  - Medical lock – Small airlock for transfer of medical supplies
  - Moon pool – Protected access to a body of water from inside a submerged or floating vessel or structure.
  - Revolving door – Regulates building air pressure and temperature
  - Sally port – Focused on security rather than air pressure
  - Suitport – Alternative technology to enable extravehicular activity
  - Supply lock – Small airlock to transfer supplies between areas of different pressure
  - Vestibule – Regulates building temperature
  - "Light-locks" in planetariums and darkrooms
- Crew and Science Airlock Module
- Lock-out submersible – Submersible with an airlock and diving chamber from which divers can be deployed
