= Suitport =

Alternative technology to enable extravehicular activity

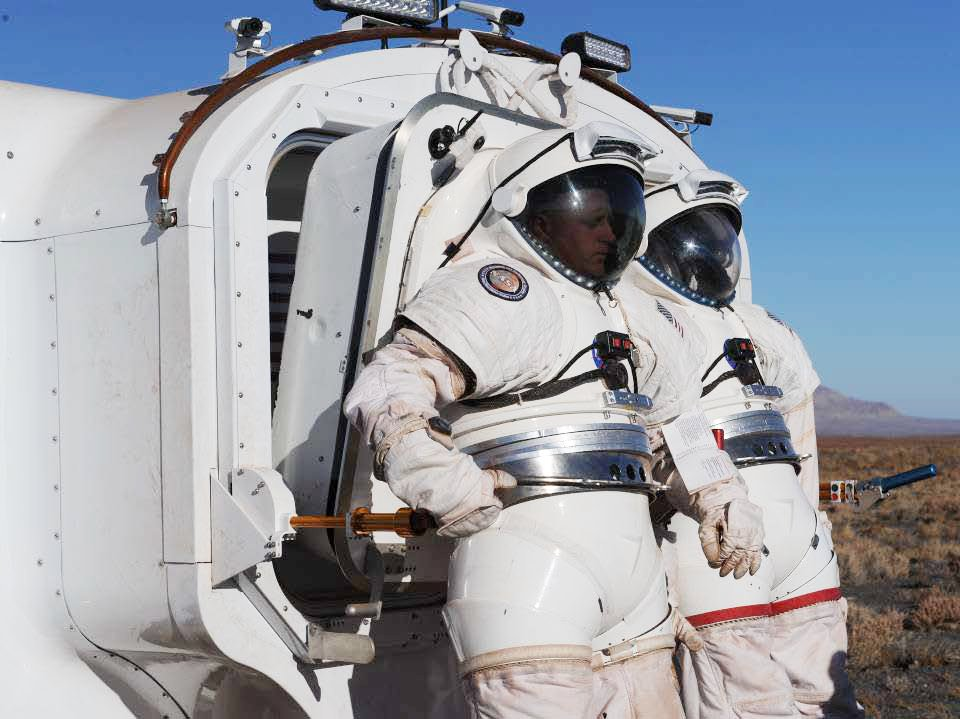
A test disconnect from a suitport mockup during field tests

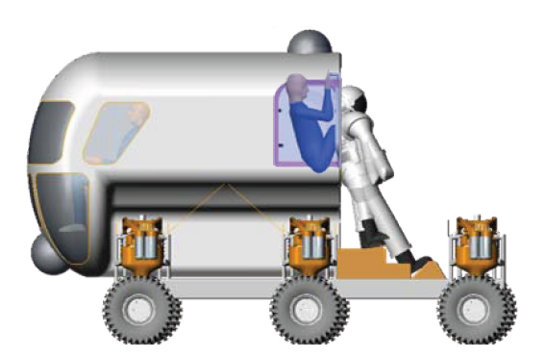
An astronaut entering a spacesuit through a suitport

A suitport or suitlock is an alternative technology to an airlock, designed for use in hazardous environments including in human spaceflight, especially planetary surface exploration. Suitports present advantages over traditional airlocks in terms of mass, volume, and ability to mitigate contamination by—and of—the local environment.

== Operation ==
In a suitport system, a rear-entry space suit is attached and sealed against the outside of a spacecraft, space habitat, or pressurized rover, facing outward. To begin an extra-vehicular activity (EVA), an astronaut in shirt-sleeves first enters the suit feet-first from inside the pressurized environment, and closes and seals the space suit backpack and the vehicle's hatch (which seals to the backpack for dust containment). The astronaut then unseals and separates the suit from the vehicle, and is ready to perform an EVA.

To re-enter the vehicle, the astronaut backs up to the suitport and seals the suit to the vehicle, before opening the hatch and backpack and transferring back into the vehicle. If the vehicle and suit do not operate at the same pressure, it will be necessary to equalize the two pressures before the hatch can be opened.

== Advantages and disadvantages ==
=== Advantages ===
Suitports carry three major advantages over traditional airlocks. First, the mass and volume required for a suitport is significantly less than that required for an airlock. Launch mass is at a premium in modern chemical rocket-powered launch vehicles, at an estimated cost of US$60,000 per kilogram delivered to the lunar surface.

Secondly, suitports can eliminate or minimize the problem of dust migration. During the Apollo program, it was discovered that the lunar soil is electrically charged, and adheres readily to any surface with which it comes into contact, a problem magnified by the sharp, barb-like shapes of the dust particles. Lunar dust may be harmful in several ways:

- The abrasive nature of the dust particles may rub and wear down surfaces through friction.
- The dust may damage coatings used on gaskets, optical lenses, solar panels, windows, and wiring.
- The dust may cause damage to astronauts' lungs, similarly to asbestos, as well as nervous and cardiovascular systems, leading to conditions such as pneumoconiosis.

During the Apollo missions, the astronauts donned their space suits inside the Apollo Lunar Module cabin, which was then depressurized to allow them to exit the vehicle. Upon the end of EVA, the astronauts would re-enter the cabin in their suits, bringing with them a great deal of dust which had adhered to the suits. Several astronauts reported a "gunpowder" smell and respiratory or eye irritation upon opening their helmets and being exposed to the dust.

When the suit is attached to the vehicle, any dust which may have adhered to the backpack of the suit is sealed between the outside of the backpack and the vehicle-side hatch. Any dust on the suit that is not on the backpack remains sealed outside the vehicle. Likewise, the suitport prevents contamination of the external environment by microbes carried by the astronaut.

Finally, suitports significantly reduce ingress and egress time, and virtually remove the need for pumpdown of the airlock – which normally either results in significant air loss, or requires heavy and complex pumping machinery – as the only volume that needs to be pressurized is that between the vehicle hatch and the life-support backpack, and even that only as needed for repair, decontamination, or refitting of the suit.

=== Disadvantages ===
Disadvantages of suitports include the additional mass of the interface on the rear of the space suit which may be more than 4.5 kilograms (9.9 lb), and increased mechanical complexity, potentially reducing the overall reliability of the EVA system. According to NASA's Exploration Systems Mission Directorate, disadvantages of suitports also include:

- A lower technology readiness level (TRL) than airlocks
- Greater difficulty for incapacitated crewmembers to ingress
- Possible requirement for suit donning at 8 pounds per square inch (0.54 atm) with relaxed man-loads
- Likely requirement for some back-mounted primary life support system components, introducing challenges for achieving an optimal center of mass.

== Development and use ==
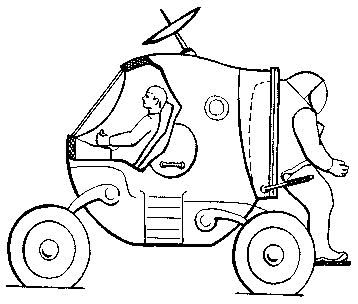
Space suit docked to rover with suitport

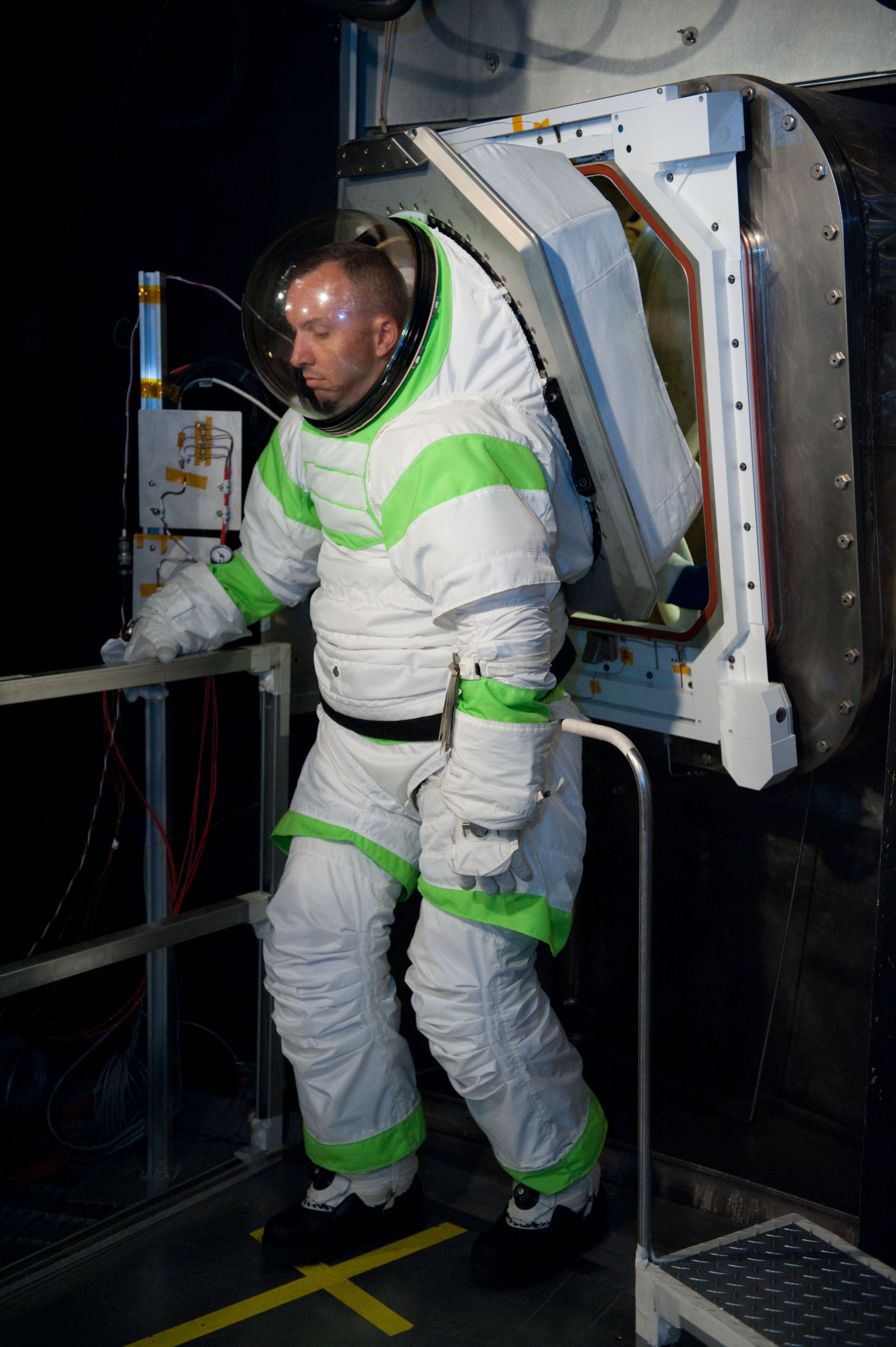
Suitport concept being tested with the Z-1 prototype spacesuit in 2012

The first EVA rear entry space suit was developed at NPP Zvezda in 1962. The suitport concept was suggested for use in the Soviet crewed Moon program. A patent for a suitport was first filed in 1980 in the Soviet Union, by Isaak Abramov of Zvezda and Yuri Nazarov of CKBM.

A US patent for a suitport was first filed in 1987 by Marc M. Cohen of NASA's Ames Research Center. Further patents were filed in 1996 by Philip Culbertson Jr., and in 2003 by Joerg Boettcher, Stephen Ransom, and Frank Steinsiek.

As of 1995, suitports have found a practical, terrestrial application as part of a NASA Ames hazardous materials vehicle, where the use of the suitport eliminates the need to decontaminate the hazmat suit before doffing. A suitport prototype built by Brand Griffin has been used in a simulated lunar gravity test on board NASA Johnson's C-135 aircraft.

Suitports may find use as part of future NASA projects aimed at achieving a return to the Moon and crewed exploration of Mars. NASA's conceptual Space Exploration Vehicle has two suitports on the back of the craft.

Testing has been taking place in combination with the Z-1 prototype spacesuit inside NASA's human-rated thermal vacuum chamber B at the Johnson Space Center. Early uncrewed tests of the suitport were conducted in June 2012. The first crewed tests of the suitport occurred on 16 and 18 July 2012; during these tests the spacesuit was kept at a pressure of 14.7 psi (1 atm), with the chamber pressure at approximately 6.5 psi (0.44 atm), equivalent to an altitude of 21,000 feet (6,400 m). Future tests were planned for September and August 2012, where NASA planned to keep the spacesuit at a pressure of 8 psi (0.5 atm), and the vacuum chamber at roughly 0 psi (0 atm). Suitports may eventually be tested on the International Space Station.

== See also ==
- Space exploration – Investigation of outer space
- Constellation program – Cancelled 2005–2010 NASA human spaceflight program
  - Lunar outpost (NASA) – Concepts for extended human presence on the Moon
  - Altair (spacecraft) – Planned lander spacecraft component of NASA's cancelled Project Constellation
- Lunar surface – Structure and composition of the Moon
- Colonization of the Moon – Settlement on the Moon
- Colonization of Mars
- Mars suit – Space suit for the Martian surface
- Single-person spacecraft – Type of spacecraft with one occupant
