= Symptom (disambiguation) =

Symptom refers to a medical indication of an illness.

Symptoms may also refer to:

- Symptoms (film), 1974 horror film
- Symptoms (Useless ID album), 2012
- Symptoms (Ashley Tisdale album), 2019
- Symptoms (song), a 2013 song by Shinee
- "Symptoms", a song by Atlas Genius from the 2013 album When It Was Now
- "Symptoms", a song by Alanis Morissette from the 2002 album Hands Clean

== See also ==
- Symptomatic (disambiguation)
