= National Center for Engineering and Technology Education =

The National Center for Engineering and Technology Education is a partnership of four land-grant research universities (Utah State University, the University of Minnesota, the University of Illinois and the University of Georgia), five technology teacher education universities (Brigham Young University, California State University at Los Angeles, University of Wisconsin–Stout, Illinois State University and North Carolina A&T State University) and fifteen K–12 school districts. The center was funded by the National Science Foundation in 2004 under NSF program award 0426421.

== Goals ==
The ultimate goal of the center is to rethink the pedagogy of technology education programs to include more engineering content and design, problem solving, and analytical skills and to implement those changes in technology teacher education programs around the United States. This will be accomplished through the teaming of engineering and technology education faculty at NCETE sites in a three pronged approach:

- Graduate student fellowships will create educational leaders engaged in technology teacher preparation and professional development with the skills required to integrate engineering and technology education.
- Research on how students learn technological concepts, problem solving and how technology teachers can best be prepared for teaching engineering concepts and how such programs can be evaluated will be conducted
- Professional development for 9–12 grade teachers will be conducted and will focus on instructions techniques that support the science, technology, engineering and mathematics (STEM) initiative.
