= Z series space suits =

Series of prototype space suit models

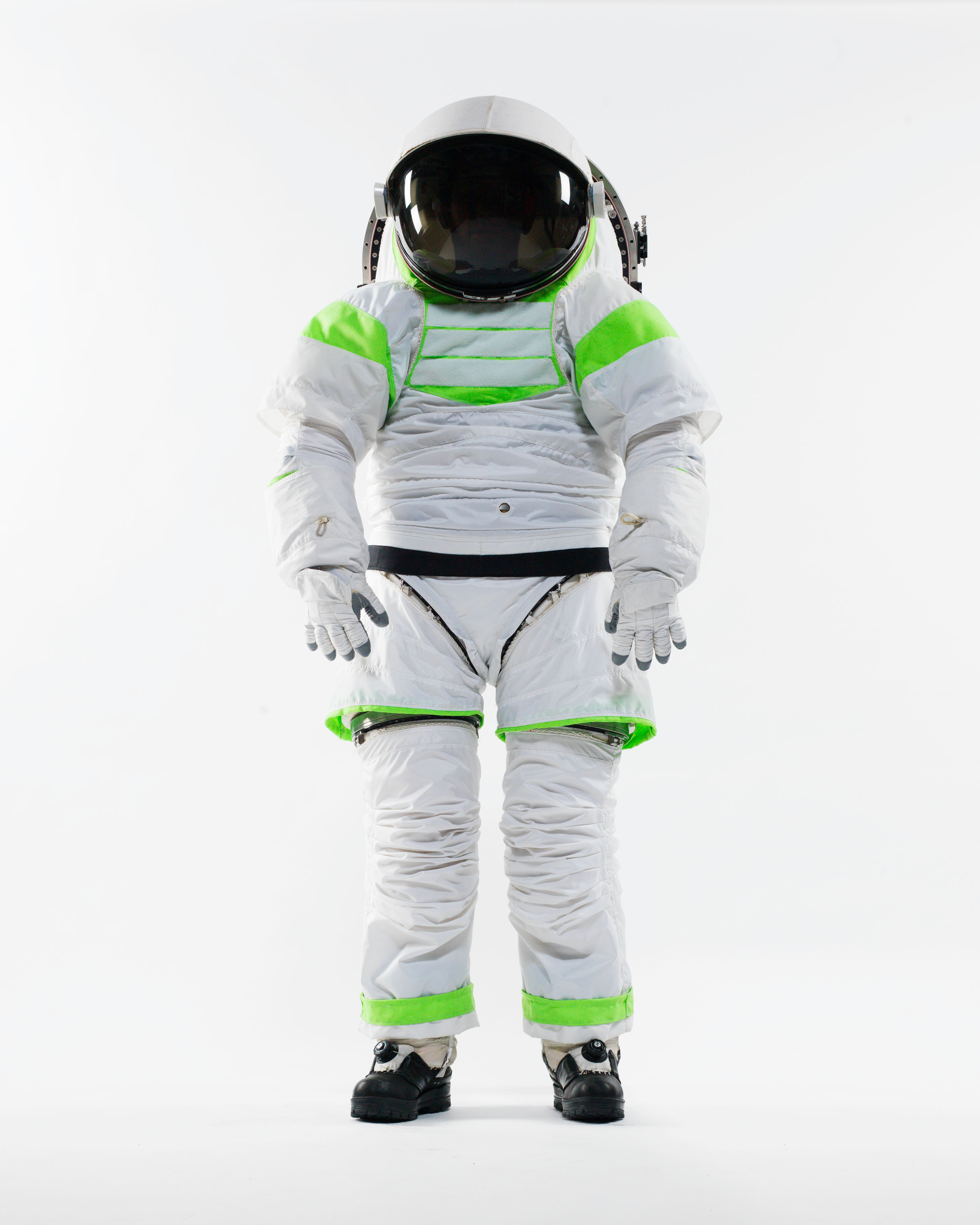
The Z-1 is the first Z prototype suit constructed.

The Z series is a series of prototype extra-vehicular activity (EVA) space suits being developed in the Advanced Extravehicular Mobility Unit (AEMU) project under NASA's Advanced Exploration Systems (AES) program. The suits are being designed to be used for both micro-gravity and planetary EVAs.

Along with a NASA designed life support system, the new higher pressure Z suits allow for bypassing pre-breathe and allows for quick donning of the suit and exit of the space craft. The Z-1 is the first suit to be successfully integrated into a suitport dock mechanism eliminating the need for an air lock, and reducing the consumable demands on long term missions. A later variant is planned to be tested on the International Space Station in 2017.

== Versions ==
=== Z-1 ===
The Z-1 suit consists of a soft upper torso, soft lower torso, glove assembly, boot assembly and hemispherical dome helmet. Z-1 is called a "soft" suit because when unpressurized its primary structures are pliable fabrics, although it does have several hard mobility elements. The suit has a mass of 126 pounds (57 kg), with the suitport interface plate (SIP) it is 154 pounds (70 kg), and with the SIP and portable life support system (PLSS) mock-up it is 162 pounds (73 kg).

The Z-1 prototype was designed and built by ILC Dover for NASA. The Z-1 was named one of Time magazine's Best Inventions of the Year for 2012. Because of its unique neon green colored stripes on the arms and legs, the suit has entered popular culture as the "Buzz Lightyear Suit" for sharing the color worn by the character in the Pixar movie Toy Story.

NASA has been running a series of tests on the Z-1. According to a NASA report there have been two parts of the testing: (1) characterize the suit performance to down selection of components for the planned Z-2 Space Suit and (2) "develop interfaces with the suitport and exploration vehicles through pressurized suit evaluations."

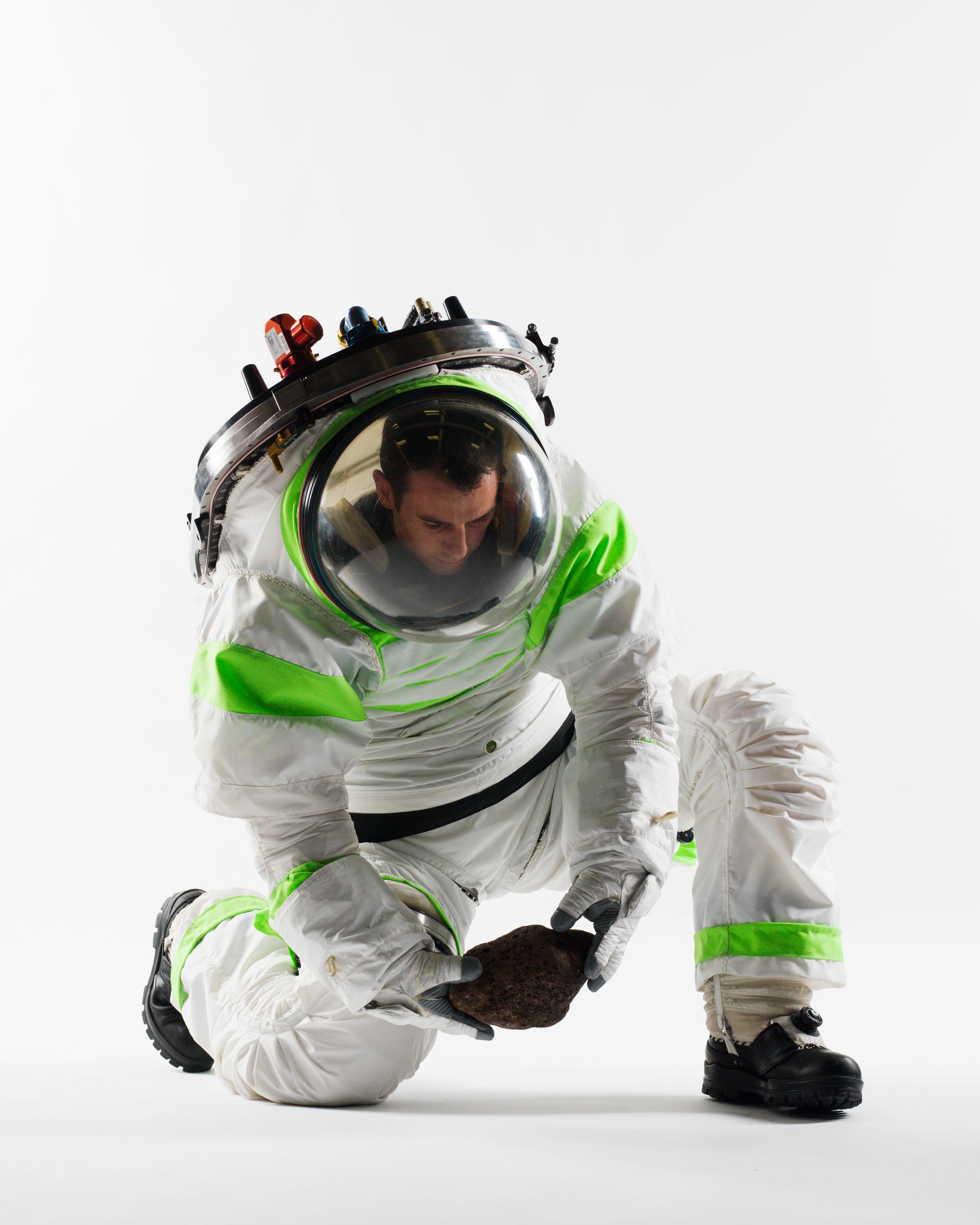
Z-1 Spacesuit Prototype - kneeling demonstration (November 2012)

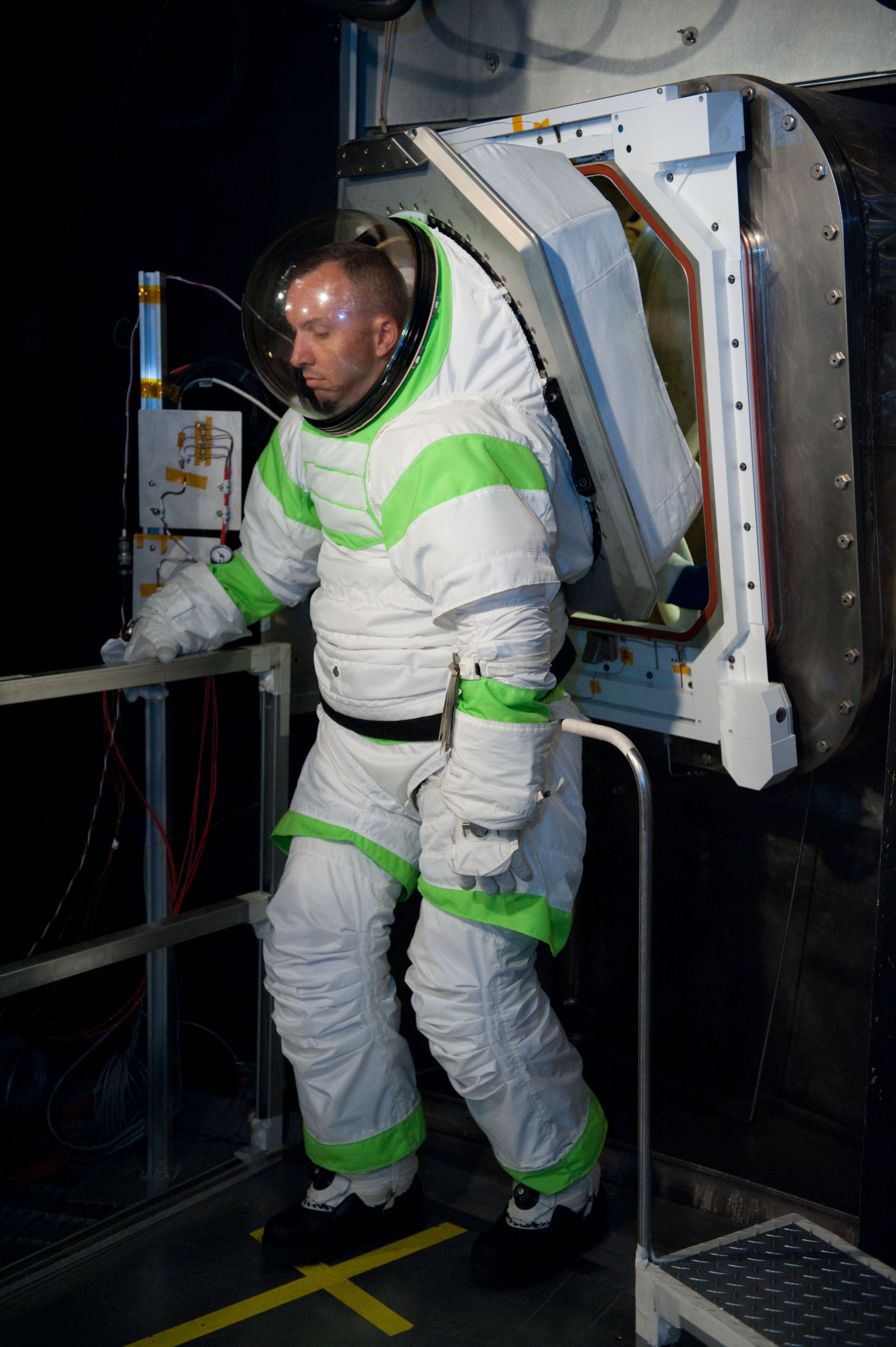
Suitport tests with the Z-1 suit

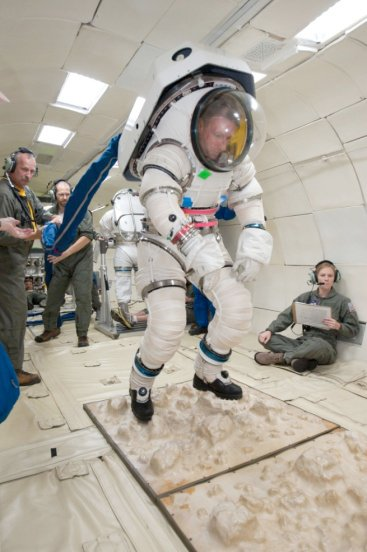
Z-1 suit being tested during a parabolic flight

=== Z-2 ===
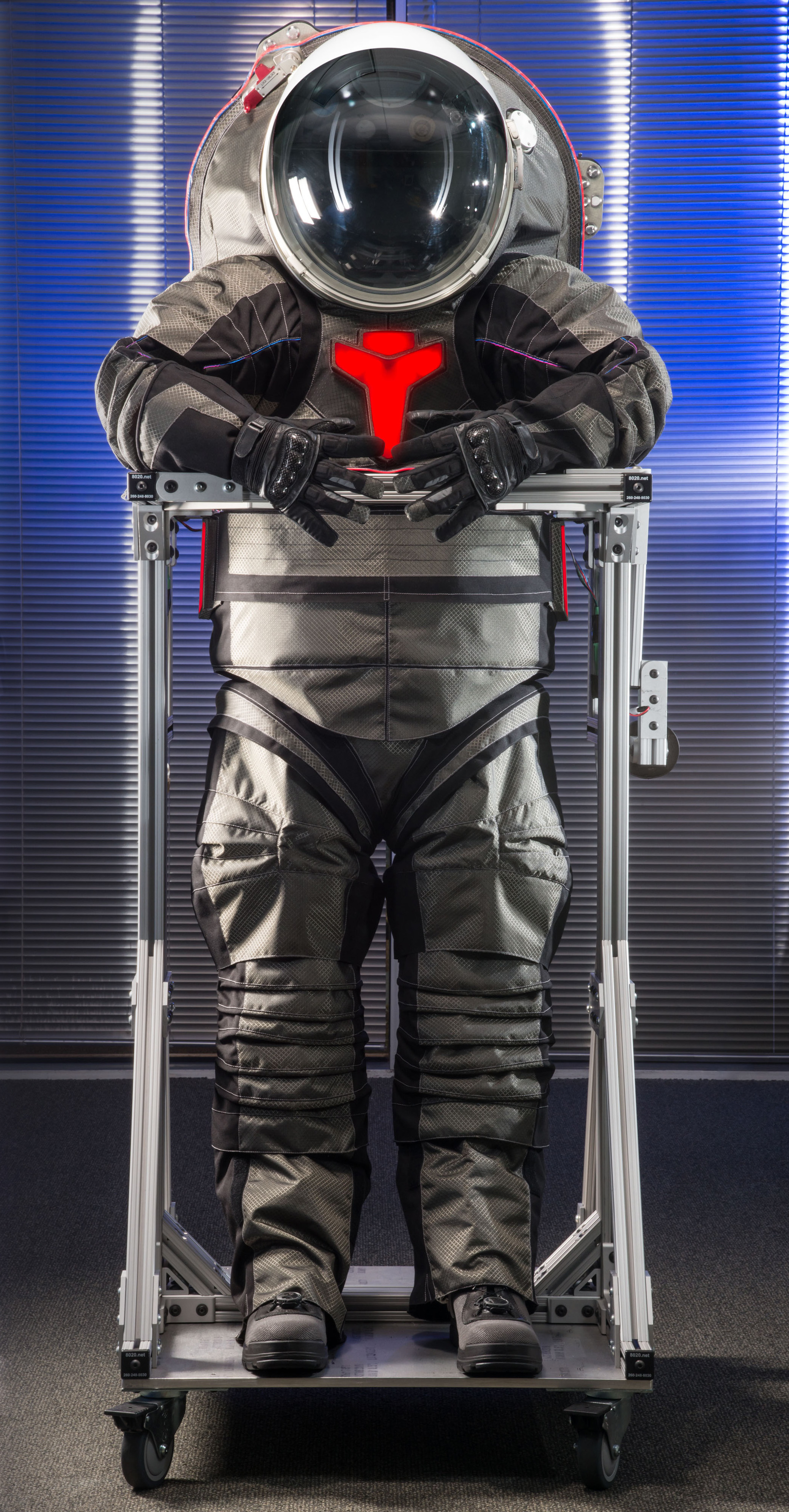
NASA Z-2 spacesuit prototype

Both ILC Dover and David Clark competed for the $4.4 million contract to design, manufacture and test the Z-2 prototype space suit. In April 2013, it was announced that ILC Dover had won; the contract is expected to last for an 18-month period.

The Z-2 will use a non-autoclave hard composite upper torso; it is believed this will improve its long-term durability. The design of the shoulder and hip has been improved based on Z-1 testing. The Z-2 will use higher fidelity boots along with materials that are compatible with a full vacuum environment. The suit is expected to have a mass of 143 pounds (65 kg). The Z-2 will be designed to interface with NASA's advanced portable life support system, currently under development at the Johnson Space Center. The suit will also be designed to interface with both classical air locks and suit ports.

The Z-2 prototype suit was expected to be delivered to NASA by November 2014 with a technology readiness level of 7 but was delayed until spring 2015. Final delivery and testing in a human-rated vacuum chamber and the Neutral Buoyancy Lab is expected in 2018-2019. This is leading up to a human-rated thermal/vacuum chamber test of the suit with its portable life support system (PLSS) in 2020.

== Portable life support system ==
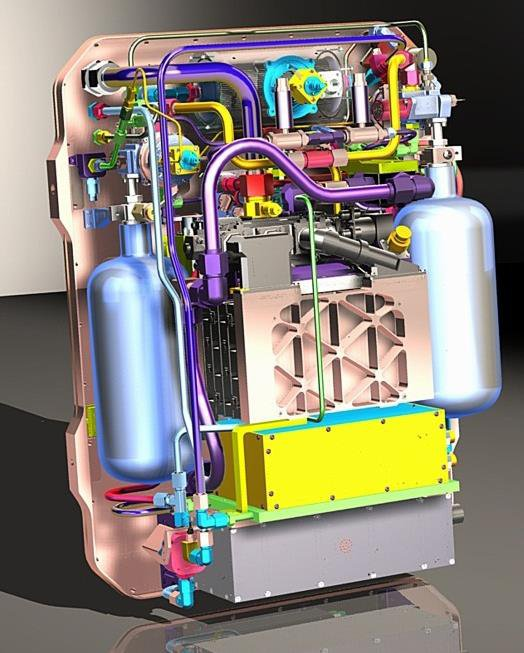
Rendering of a developmental version of the PLSS

The Next Generation Life Support (NGLS) project is developing components that are planned to be part of the PLSS. Two of those components are the Variable Oxygen Regulator (VOR) and the Rapid Cycle Amine (RCA) swing bed.

The VOR is expected to allow the suit pressure to be adjusted to 84 settings between 0 and 8.4 psid. The current Extravehicular Mobility Unit (EMU) only has two pressure settings. This new capability will enable in-suit decompression sickness treatment and flexibility for interfacing with different vehicles. It also allows EVAs to start at a higher internal pressure to decrease prebreathe time, and then slowly decrease the pressure afterward in order to maximize mobility and minimize crew fatigue.

The RCA swing bed removes carbon dioxide (CO_{2}) and controls humidity. The RCA CO_{2} removal capability is regenerated during EVA by exposure to vacuum, making it superior to previous systems. To remove CO_{2}, the current EMU has to use either a lithium hydroxide (LiOH) canister or a Metal Oxide (Metox) canister. The LiOH canister can only be used once. The Metox canister can be reused post-EVA but to do so takes fourteen hours and requires auxiliary equipment, crew time and significant electricity. RCA is expected to weigh less than current comparable systems.
