= Manual override =

A manual override (MO) or manual analog override (MAO) is a mechanism where control is taken from an automated system and given to the user. For example, a manual override in photography refers to the ability for the human photographer to turn off the automatic aperture sizing, automatic focusing, or any other automated system on the camera.

Some manual overrides can be used to veto an automated system's judgment when the system is in error. An example of this is a printer's ink level detection: in one case, a researcher found that when he overrode the system, up to 38% more pages could be printed at good quality by the printer than the automated system would have allowed.

Automated systems are becoming increasingly common and integrated into everyday objects such as automobiles and domestic appliances. This development of ubiquitous computing raises general issues of policy and law about the need for manual overrides for matters of great importance such as life-threatening situations and major economic decisions. The loyalty of such autonomous devices then becomes an issue. If they follow rules installed by the manufacturer or required by law and refuse to cede control in some situations then the owners of the devices may feel disempowered, alienated and lacking true ownership.

== Major incidents ==
China Airlines Flight 140 crashed, causing many deaths, due to a misunderstanding about the manual overrides for the autopilot. The Take-Off/Go Around system had been activated to abort a landing. It was programmed to ignore manual controls in this situation but the human pilots tried to continue the landing. The conflicting control signals from the pilots and autopilot then resulted in the aircraft stalling and crashing. The autopilot for this aircraft type was then reprogrammed so that it would never ignore a manual override.

== See also ==
- Big red button
- Communication cord
- Dead man's handle
- Engine control unit (ECU)
- Full authority digital engine (or electronics) control (FADEC)
- Panic button
