= Airlock (parachute) =

Safety mechanism on some types of parachute

A parachute airlock, often abbreviated as simply airlock, is a safety mechanism built into some parachute models which helps them resist losing their shape while open. It uses a ram air structure to stiffen each section of the outer edge.

The design was first developed by parachute inventor Brian Germain following a near-fatal ram-air wing collapse in 1994. Germain made a full recovery and went on to personally test many of the airlock prototype parachutes, often in extreme conditions. Specific parachute designs utilizing the airlock technology include the following: Jedei, Sweptwing, Genesis, Warlock, (AirTimeDesigns.com) Vengeance, (PerformanceDesigns.com) Samurai, Lotus, Sensei R1 (BigAirSportz.com).

While the airlock approach to canopy design has generated an enthusiastic user base, the design also has its problems. For example, a ram-air parachute designed with airlocks will not deflate quickly upon landing on a windy day. This may result in dragging a parachutist across the ground. Parachute packers have also noted that these canopies take longer to pack due to the extra time it takes to squeeze the air out. However, proponents of the design prefer the safety advantages of a stable canopy in flight over the convenience of other designs on the ground.

== Patent abstract ==
=== Valve apparatus for ram-air wings ===
This invention describes a ram-air type inflatable wing that is resistant to deflation. The inflatable air wing includes a plurality of cells disposed between the top and bottom skins of the wing, with at least one valve positioned within each of a plurality of cells. Each valve generally inhibits deflation of the cells when the air pressure inside the cells is greater than the air pressure outside the cells and permits the cells to inflate when the air pressure outside the cell is greater than the air pressure inside the cells.

Inventors: Germain; Brian S. (Kensington, Maryland)

Appl. No.: 08/617,471

Filed: March 15, 1996
