= Airlock (band) =

Belgian musical group

- Origin: Brussels, Belgium
- Genre: Trip hop
- Years active: 1997–present
- Label: One Little Indian
- Members: Renaud Charlier; Ernst W. Meinrath; Pierre Mussche; Esra Tasasiz

Airlock is a Belgium based trip hop musical group formed November 1997 in Brussels.

The band members Renaud Charlier, Ernst W. Meinrath and Pierre Mussche were known as musicom before striking up a cooperation with Scottish-born singer Esra Tasasiz. The members also contributed music to Olivier Van Hoofstadt's films Keo and Parabellum before their first album took shape. Eventually, the group became notable for their ambient music on TV series CSI: Crime Scene Investigation and CSI: Miami.

De Morgen, writing about Airlock's "very first performance" which was a warmup for Hooverphonic, described the group as "a Brussels quartet following in the footsteps of Hooverphonic". Drystar was described as "commendable", an "album where languid trip-hop beats join forces with the intriguing voice of Esra Tasasiz. This results in beautiful songs, though perhaps lacking a bit of personality".

AllMusic rated Drystar with 3.5 out of 5 stars. The album was "a mixed affair", but "definitely offers its share of pleasant pop tracks" with "minor gems scattered throughout". Singer Esra Tasasiz was a plus, with her "naive coo" standing out as "an amiable counterpoint to the warm beats crafted by her bandmates" When not hitting the mark, the record was "boring" and "woefully dull". There was a "lack of variety, which results in some faux Massive Attack dreaminess that doesn't go anywhere". Plattentests.de only gave 4 out of 10, stating that Drystar showcased "skillful production" and "some pleasing melodies" courtesy of "Ezra Tasasiz's sweet voice". As far as the trip-hop went, it was a sound "about as modern as the social worker across the hall's tiger-striped sweater". The album elicited "yawns" and "becomes increasingly tiresome over time". "Of course, such background music isn't meant to be disturbing, but some tracks would even lull the Sandman to sleep", and would be best fitted as "hold music for telephones".

New Music Monthly, however, opined that Airlock managed to "breathe new life into left-for-dead trip-hop", showcasing "strength in combining electronic elements with infectious melody. Let's all be happy that Airlock wasn't satisfied just writing music to sell cars".

== Discography ==
- Drystar - 2001 (One Little Indian Records)
- Symptomatic - 2004 (One Little Indian Records)
- The Long Journey Home - 2005
- The Room - 2006
