= Lunar I-Hab =

Planned lunar habitat module

International Habitation Module
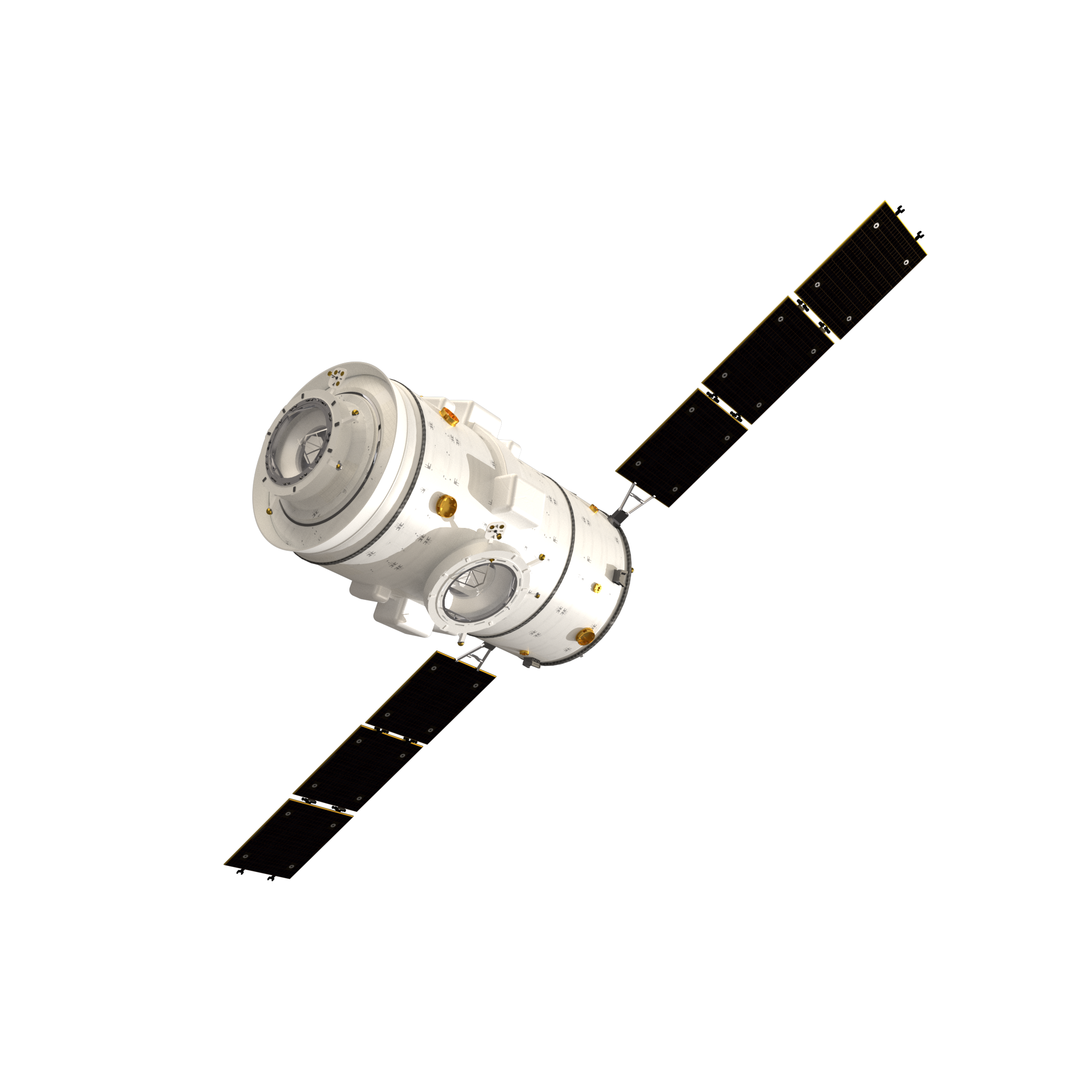
- Rendering of the International Habitat (I-Hab) module of the Lunar Gateway.
- Mission type: Habitat, command and control module
- Website: Gateway: International Habitat

Spacecraft properties
- Spacecraft: I-HAB
- Manufacturer: Thales Alenia Space
- Launch mass: 10,000 kg (22,000 lb)
- Dimensions: 5.4 m (18 ft) (diameter), 10 m^{3} (350 cu ft) (habitable vol.)

Start of mission
- Launch date: 2028 (planned)
- Rocket: SLS
- Launch site: Kennedy Space Center, LC-39B

Orbital parameters
- Reference system: Near-rectilinear halo orbit
- ESA insignia Lunar Gateway

The Lunar I-Hab (formerly known as International Habitation Module, International Habitat or I-HAB) was designed as a habitat module of the Lunar Gateway station, to be built by the European Space Agency (ESA) in collaboration with the Japan Aerospace Exploration Agency (JAXA). The I-HAB will have a maximum launch mass of 10,000 kg (22,000 lb) and provide a habitable volume of 10 m^{3} (350 cu ft) (the gross pressurized volume is 36 m^{3} (1,300 cu ft)). In March 2026, Lunar Gateway was cancelled, with its components, including I-Hab, to be repurposed for use in a lunar base.

== Background ==
Concept work on the I-HAB module started in early July 2018 with a consortium of companies led by Airbus and including Thales Alenia Space. Airbus-lead consortium worked with ESA to develop an overall design concept. Airbus and Thales Alenia were also independently contracted in September 2018 to run parallel Phase A/B studies. Phase A focused on establishing the program's feasibility, and Phase B looked to develop a preliminary definition for the module. ESA conducted a Preliminary Requirements Review in November 2018 and the consortium ran its own design meeting in March 2019. This culminated in the development and publication of the System Requirements Document in July 2019, which was built on NASA's requirements for Lunar Gateway.

=== Contract ===
On 14 October 2020, Thales Alenia announced that they had been selected by ESA to build the I-HAB module. The company will be the prime contractor, responsible for program management, design, fabrication of the primary structure, mechanical and thermal systems, and final integration and testing. Thales Alenia previously built several modules for the International Space Station (ISS), including Columbus, Harmony, Tranquility, Leonardo, and the Cupola. It was the second largest industrial provider to the ISS. It also built the pressure vessels for the Automated Transfer Vehicle (ATV) and Cygnus spacecraft; and the Multi-Purpose Logistics Modules, which were used to transport cargo inside the Space Shuttle orbiters. The expected total cost of the contract with Thales Alenia will be 327 million euros, with the first tranches of payments equal to 36 million euros.

ESA formalised their involvement in the Lunar Gateway on October 27, 2020, with an agreement with NASA.

== Design and manufacture ==
Mission requirements for module specified the need to provide habitation and working space for four astronauts for a duration of 30 to 90 days. I-HAB will feature four docking ports, two axial ports for connection to other Lunar Gateway elements, and two radial ports for cargo vehicle and lunar lander vehicle. Due to Lunar Gateway not being permanently inhabited, the module would have been optimised for remote operation and maintenance, which would be achieved through the use of internal robotic interfaces and a robotic arm.

The module aimed to provide galley facilities; hygiene and waste management systems; exercise equipment; cargo and consumables storage; refrigeration; airlocks; and workstations, monitor, and control consoles. Various elements of the module are contributions from partners. Environmental control and life support system, batteries, thermal control, and imagery components will be built and supplied by JAXA; avionics hardware and software will be supplied by US National Aeronautics and Space Administration (NASA); and robotic interfaces will be provided by the Canadian Space Agency (CSA).

I-HAB was planned to feature four docking ports. Two axial ports to be used for connection to other Lunar Gateway elements, including the Habitation and Logistics Outpost and airlock. Two radial docking ports to be used for connection to the European System Providing Refueling, Infrastructure and Telecommunications (ESPRIT) module and for accommodating visiting cargo vehicles, Orion spacecraft and lunar lander.

I-HAB was planned to launch on NASA's Space Launch System. The size and weight of the module were constrained by the possibility of its launch vehicle being switched to SpaceX's Falcon Heavy. The inner diameter was reduced from 4.2 meters to 3.4 meters, and internal length reduced from 6.6 meters to 5.9 meters. Both reductions resulted from a smaller payload fairing, the need for a separate service vehicle to replace the transport service provided by the Orion spacecraft, and docking targets for the radial ports.

ESA completed the preliminary design review of the I-HAB in November 2021. In preparation for this review, Thales Alenia partnered with the European Astronaut Centre to allow ESA astronauts to experience the usable volume and crew accommodations within the habitat. This was achieved via virtual reality. As of May 2024, the module was well underway in the testing phase.

In April 2026, NASA reported and ESA confirmed the discovery of corrosion affecting both the I-HAB and its Habitation and Logistics Outpost (HALO) module. NASA Administrator Jared Isaacman indicated that addressing the issue may not be straightforward, stating that he was "not sure there is a deterministic approach to repair". He also questioned whether repair efforts were "even warranted", in light of NASA's shifting focus to developing a lunar surface base. The pressure vessels for both modules were built by Thales Alenia Space. The company described it as a "well-known metallurgical behavior" and noted that similar conditions had been encountered in modules developed for the International Space Station, which have continued to operate reliably and exceeded their original design lifespans. Furthermore, the responsible companies stated that the issues are going to be resolved without threatening the next steps.

Cargo docking port
Solar Array	HLCS communications module	ERM observation port and fuel storage
PPE propulsion module	HALO logistics and habitat	I-HAB logistics and habitat	Orion docking port
Solar Array	HLS docking port

== Launch ==
The module was slated to launch in 2028 on the Artemis IV mission with the Space Launch System Block 1B rocket, along with a crewed Orion spacecraft. The module would be located within a Universal Stage Adapter (USA), and attached to a payload adapter connected to an Exploration Upper Stage (EUS). Once the translunar injection burn has been completed the Orion/EUS stack will undergo a procedure similar to the transposition and docking procedure performed during the Apollo Program, during this procedure the Orion spacecraft would separate from the US, after which the EUS rotates away from the Orion spacecraft to allow for the jettison of the USA. The EUS would then rotate back for Orion to dock with the I-HAB module. Following a successful docking, the EUS would then release the I-HAB module from the payload adaptor along with the Orion spacecraft attached. Orion would then be responsible for delivery of the module to the Lunar Gateway in its near-rectilinear halo orbit.
