= Lunar Link =

European lunar communications hardware

- Lunar Link attached to HALO
- Operator: European Space Agency
- Manufacturer: (France) (Italy) Thales Alenia Space
- Function: Radio frequency communication
- Website: esa.int: Gateway Lunar Link

Properties
- Mass: 270 kg
- Dimensions: 2.5 m x 2.5 m
- Power consumption: up to 600 W

Host spacecraft
- Spacecraft

Lunar Link, also known as Halo Lunar Communication System (HLCS), is a package of spaceflight telecommunications equipment developed by the European Space Agency (ESA) for providing radio frequency connections to spacecraft on and around the Moon. It was originally intended to be used on the Lunar Gateway station as part of ESPRIT. However, the Lunar Gateway project was cancelled by NASA in 2026 and ESA is exploring possibilities of using Lunar Link as a standalone lunar communications satellite, possibly as part of the Moonlight programme.

== Design ==
Lunar Link measures 2.5 m (8 ft 2 in) in both length and width, has a mass of 270 kg (600 lb), and features two 125 cm (49 in) dish antennas. These allow it to achieve a data rate of up to 25 Mbps. Because of its two dishes, the system is able to communicate with two different targets at once in S- or K-band radio frequencies.

== History ==
The Halo Lunar Communication System (HLCS) was renamed to Lunar Link by ESA in April 2024. In March 2026, NASA effectively cancelled the international Lunar Gateway project. By that time, Lunar Link's antennas have completed environmental testing and the entire instrument package was almost complete. Lunar Link was completed later that year and ESA intends to place it into controlled storage by the end of 2026, while it studies possibilities of launching it independently from Gateway as a standalone lunar communications satellite.

== See also ==
- List of European Space Agency programmes and missions
- Terrae Novae – European programme for human spaceflight and robotic space exploration
- Lunar Pathfinder – European communication satellite for the Moon
- NovaMoon – European Lunar surface mission for satellite navigation on the Moon
- Sample Transfer Arm – European robotic arm for space exploration
