= European System Providing Refueling, Infrastructure and Telecommunications =

Planned module of the Lunar Gateway

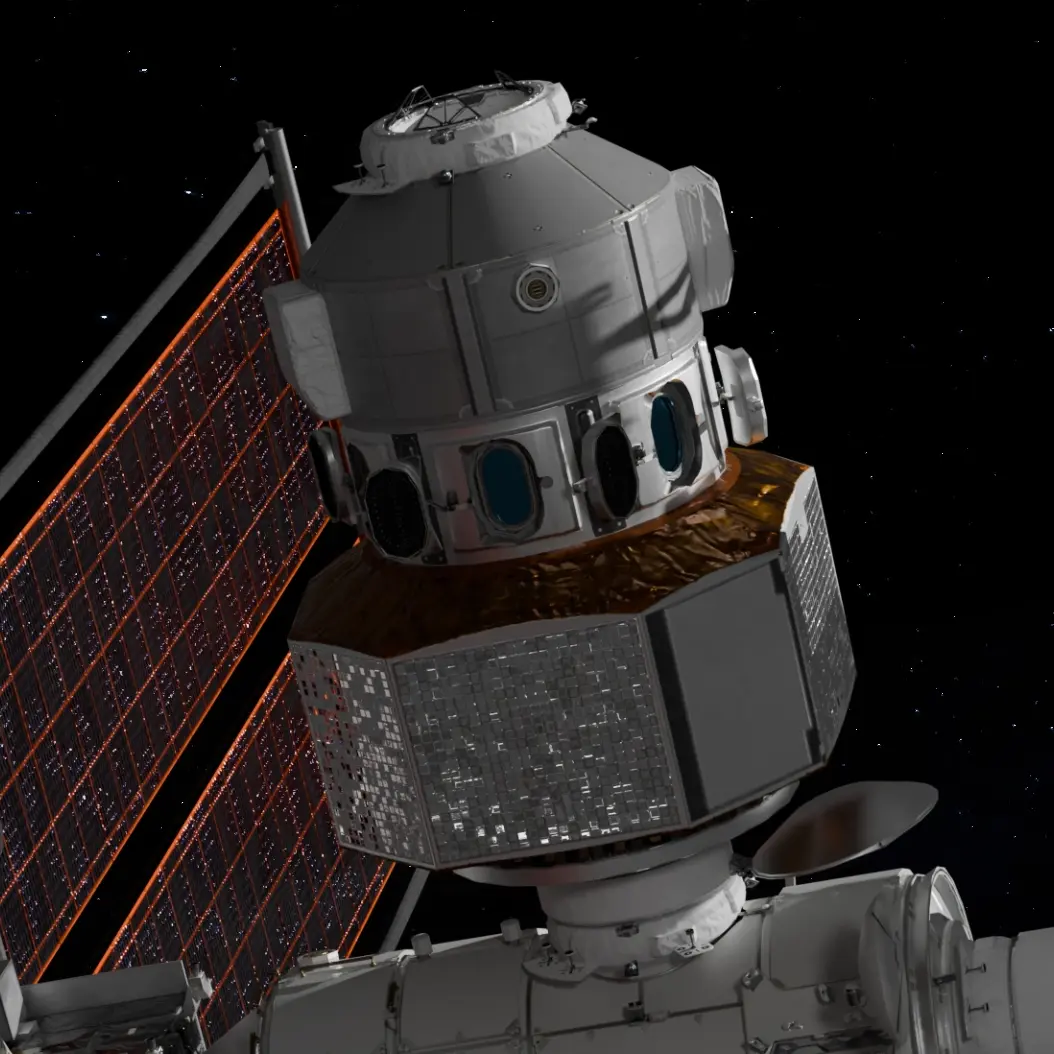
- Mission type: Habitat, communications and storage modules
- Website: Lunar Link; Lunar View

Spacecraft properties
- Manufacturer: Thales Alenia Space

Start of mission
- Launch date: 2027 (HLCS); 2030 (ERM)
- Rocket: SLS
- Launch site: Kennedy Space Center, LC-39B

Orbital parameters
- Reference system: Near-rectilinear halo orbit
- ESA insignias Lunar Gateway

The European System Providing Refueling Infrastructure and Telecommunications (ESPRIT) is an under construction module of the Lunar Gateway. It will provide refueling through additional xenon and hydrazine capacity for use in the Power and Propulsion Element's ion engines and hydrazine thrusters. It will also provide additional communications equipment, a habitation area, and storage. It will have a launch mass of approximately 10,000 kg (22,000 lb), a length of 6.4 m (21 ft), and a diameter of 4.6 m (15 ft). ESA awarded two parallel design studies for ESPRIT, one mostly led by Airbus in partnership with Comex and OHB and one led by Thales Alenia Space. The construction of the module was approved in November 2019. On 14 October 2020, Thales Alenia Space announced that they had been selected by ESA to build the ESPRIT module.

The module is currently slated to launch as a co-manifested payload on Artemis V in 2030. 1.5 tons of cargo will be packed inside the module for launch.

== Configuration ==
The ESPRIT module will consist of two parts, the Halo Lunar Communication System (HLCS) and the ESPRIT Refueling Module (ERM).

=== Halo Lunar Communication System (HLCS) ===
The Halo Lunar Communication System (HLCS) will provide communications for the station, allowing it to transmit data to and receive data from other spacecraft on and around the Moon. It will launch in 2027 pre-attached to the HALO module, for which Thales has separately been awarded a contract by NASA to construct its hull and micrometeoroid protection. The HLCS will measure 2.5 m (8 ft 2 in) in both length and width, have a mass of 270 kg (600 lb), and feature two 125 cm (49 in) dish antennas. These will allow HLCS to achieve a data rate of up to 25 Mbps. Because of its two dishes, the system will be able to communicate with two different targets (including spacecraft landing on the Moon or operating around Gateway) at once in S- or K-band radio frequencies.

ESA now refers to the ESPRIT HLCS as Lunar Link. Thales Alenia Space completed integration and testing of Lunar Link in 2026, several months after the cancellation of Gateway by NASA. ESA planned to place the hardware into controlled storage by the end of 2026, while it studied possibilities of launching it independently from Gateway as a standalone lunar communications satellite.

=== ESPRIT Refueling Module (ERM) ===
The ESPRIT Refueling Module (ERM) will contain the propellant tanks, docking ports, and a small windowed habitation corridor. The interior of the module will primarily be used for storage, although it will feature one workstation for astronaut use and six windows. The workstation and windows will be useful for photographing the lunar surface, controlling Canadarm3, and monitoring docking spacecraft. The module features two docking ports, meaning that once it docks to the HALO module, resupply craft and other vessels can dock to ESPRIT. These can include future propellant tankers to further refuel Gateway if needed. The ERM also features batteries and small surface-mounted solar panels to power the module on its way to the Moon.

A small science airlock was planned for the module during early designs in order to transfer scientific payloads outside the Gateway, but recent designs lack the airlock.

The ERM is scheduled to launch on an SLS Block 1B launch vehicle in 2030, along with Artemis V. Packed inside the module will be approximately 1.5 tons of cargo for ESPRIT and Gateway operations. Orion will dock to ESPRIT following launch and deliver it to Gateway.

== See also ==
- Power and Propulsion Element, a core module of the Gateway that will power ESPRIT once docked and maintain the station's orbit
- Habitation and Logistics Outpost, the first habitation module of Gateway, featuring the port that ESPRIT will dock to
- Lunar I-Hab, the second habitable module of Gateway, formerly known as International Habitation Module
