= CAPSTONE 2 =

Planned NASA satellites to test Lunar rendezvous

CAPSTONE 02
- Rendering of the two-probe Cislunar Autonomous Positioning System Technology Operations and Navigation Experiment 02 in lunar orbit
- Names: Cislunar Autonomous Positioning System Technology Operations and Navigation Experiment 02
- Mission type: Technology demonstration
- Operator: Advanced Space
- Website: www.nasa.gov/mission/capstone02/

Spacecraft properties
- Spacecraft: CAPSTONE 02
- Launch mass: 2x ~400 kg (880 lb)

Start of mission
- Launch date: NET 2027
- Rocket: Falcon 9

Moon orbiter
- Orbits: Near-rectilinear halo orbit (NRHO)

CAPSTONE 02 is a planned NASA mission to lunar orbit designed as a followup to CAPSTONE (backronym: Cislunar Autonomous Positioning System Technology Operations and Navigation Experiment) that was designed to test the orbital stability for the now cancelled Lunar Gateway. Despite Gateway's cancellation on May 2, 2025, in favor of the Artemis Base Camp on the lunar surface, CAPSTONE 02 was announced on June 24, 2026. CAPSTONE 02 is currently scheduled to launch in 2027.

== Background ==
CAPSTONE became the first U.S. commercial mission to the Moon and the first spacecraft to operate in a near rectilinear halo orbit around the Moon in June 2022. CAPSTONE was a 12U cubesat that saw an extended mission until July 6, 2026, testing a series of novel communication and navigation networks. These included expanding NASA's SCaN to lunar orbit by using itself as a relay as well as more traditional methods such as an onboard star tracker and optical navigation of the lunar surface.

== Development ==
CAPSTONE 02's stated mission is to demonstrate advanced relative navigation technologies for rendezvous and proximity operations in cislunar space. The mission will consist of two identical spacecraft approximately 400 kilograms combined to be built by Terran Orbital (subsidiary of Lockheed Martin) and operated by Advanced Space. The craft will take a long, low energy, transfer orbit to the moon during which it will also study navigation in high earth orbit. Once in position the two craft will perform loitering and formation flying tests with each craft being able to freely switch between "chaser" and "target". The crafts will also carry various NASA instruments to test their software in flight as well as scientific experiments. This notably includes an optical imaging payload from Lawrence Livermore National Laboratory.

Despite the cancellation of Lunar Gateway, rendezvous and proximity operation experience will still need to be established ahead of Artemis IV, Artemis V, and future missions to construct Artemis Base Camp. CAPSTONE 02 completed its critical design review on August 25, 2026. NASA expects CAPSTONE 02 to cost just under $100 million, not including launch. On November 7 NASA announced that it had secured CAPSTONE 02's launch together on one Falcon 9 rocket alongside the first Quantum Space Ranger.
