= Crew and Science Airlock Module =

Planned airlock module

Crew and Science Airlock
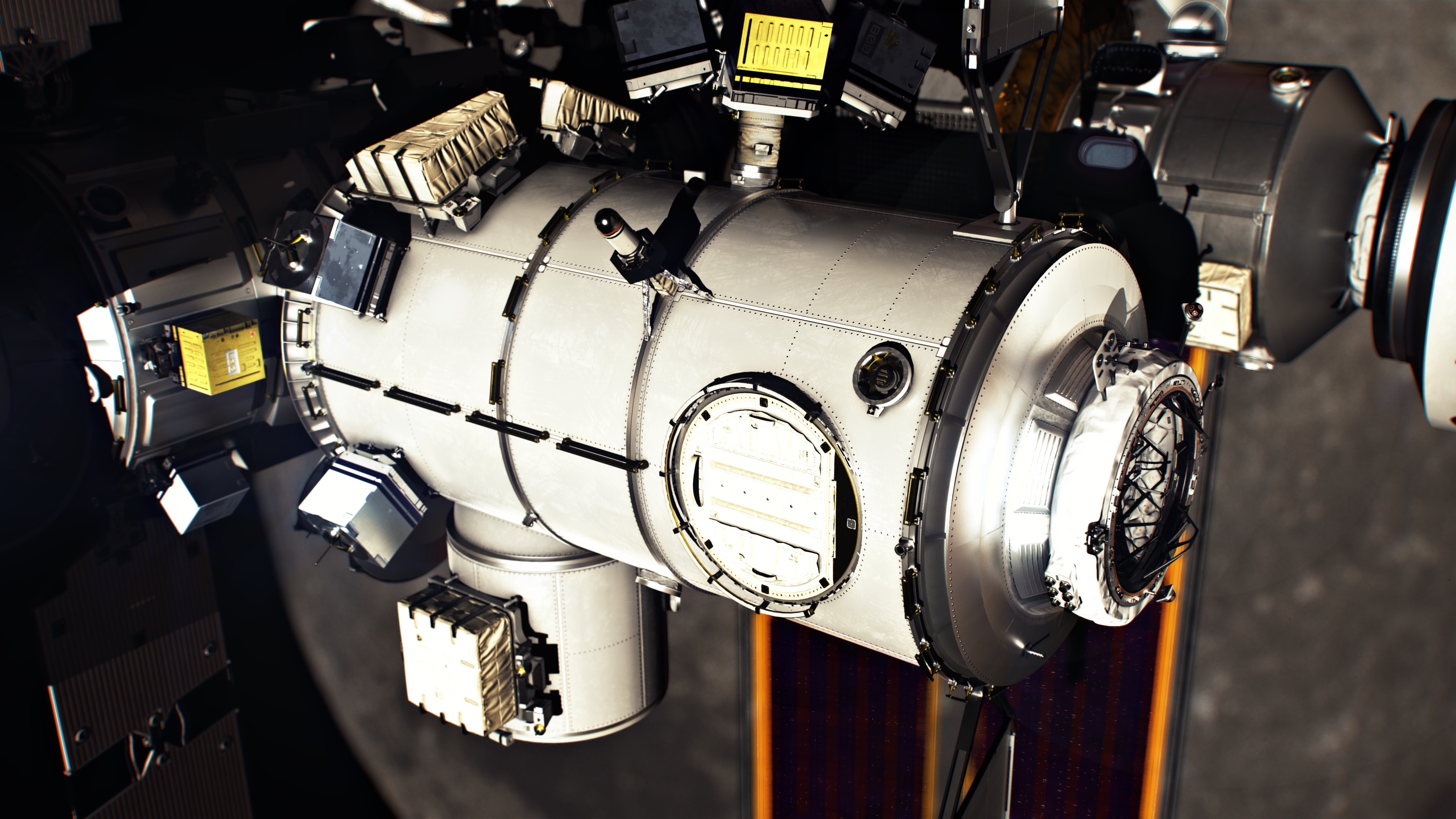
- A close-up of a government-reference airlock module for the Gateway Space Station. Mission planning calls for an airlock to be delivered and integrated to Gateway by the crewed Orion spacecraft on the Artemis VI mission after launching on a Space Launch System (SLS) Block 1B rocket.
- Mission type: Airlock module
- Website: MBRSC

Spacecraft properties
- Manufacturer: Mohammed Bin Rashid Space Centre, Thales Alenia Space

Start of mission
- Launch date: 2031 (planned)
- Rocket: SLS
- Launch site: Kennedy Space Center, LC-39B

Orbital parameters
- Reference system: Near-rectilinear halo orbit

The Crew and Science Airlock Module, also known as the Emirates Airlock Module, was designed as an airlock module of the Lunar Gateway station, to be built by the Mohammed bin Rashid Space Centre.

== Background ==
The airlock module is meant to facilitate transfers to and from the habitation modules of the Gateway and into the vacuum of space. The airlock module will therefore support deep space science research as well as external Gateway maintenance.

=== Contract ===
In January 2024, NASA announced the partnership with MBRSC with whom NASA shares a long-standing partnership. The UAE, in which the MBRSC is located, was among the initial signatories of the Artemis Accords. Soon after the contract was announced, design work began. As part of the contract, the UAE will be able to send one of their own astronauts aboard a future Artemis mission.

== Design and manufacture ==
The project will occur in a five phased approach: planning, design, qualification, flight preparation and operations. The MBRSC will be responsible for long term management, maintenance and operation of the Airlock. The Airlock will be manufactured by Thales Alenia Space

== Launch ==
The module is slated to launch on the Artemis 6 mission which is currently scheduled for 2031.
