= Habitation and Logistics Outpost =

Planned lunar orbit satellite module

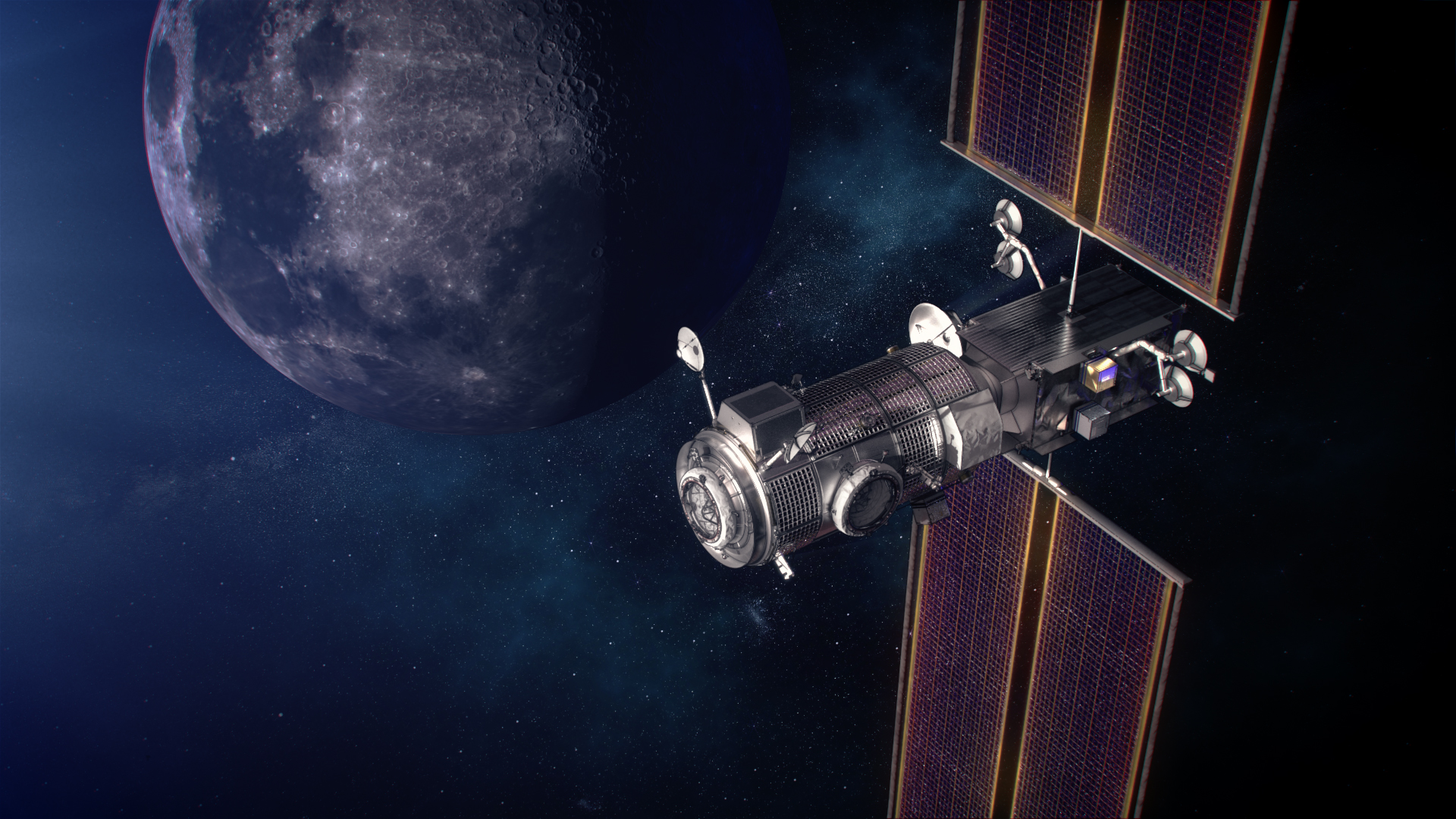
- Artist's impression of the HALO, attached to PPE.
- Mission type: Habitat, command and control module
- Operator: NASA
- Mission duration: 15 years (planned)

Spacecraft properties
- Spacecraft: HALO
- Manufacturer: Northrop Grumman / Thales Alenia Space
- Dimensions: Diameter: 3 m (9.8 ft); Length: 6.1 m (20 ft); Pressurized volume: 41.1 m^{3} (1,450 cu ft)

Start of mission
- Launch date: 2027 (canceled)
- Rocket: Falcon Heavy
- Launch site: Kennedy Space Center

Orbital parameters
- Reference system: Near-rectilinear halo orbit

The Habitation and Logistics Outpost (HALO), (formerly known as Minimal Habitation Module and Utilization Module) is a now canceled module that was planned to be part of the Lunar Gateway. It was built by Northrop Grumman. A Falcon Heavy rocket was planned to launch HALO, already attached to the Power and Propulsion Element in 2027.

The NASA Office of Inspector General (OIG) reported that, at cancellation, NASA had spent nearly $1.9 billion on HALO (up from the $1.3 billion contract value), with delivery projected for October 2026, beyond the original May 2025 commitment. However, the OIG further reported that corrosion found in HALO's primary structure would likely have delayed delivery to July 2031.

== History ==
=== Background ===
Several concepts for a habitation module for a lunar orbital outpost were developed under the Next Space Technologies for Exploration Partnerships 2 (NextSTEP-2) program. Following the establishment of a 2024 target for lunar operations under the Trump administration, NASA sought to use existing NextSTEP-2 work to meet program timelines.

In July 2019, NASA awarded a sole-source contract for the Minimal Habitation Module of the Lunar Gateway to Northrop Grumman Innovation Systems. NASA determined that Northrop Grumman was the only NextSTEP-2 contractor with designs and production capability that met the module requirements within the required schedule.

Northrop Grumman proposed a "minimal" 6.1-by-3-meter (20.0 by 9.8 ft) module based on the Cygnus spacecraft, as well as a larger 7-by-4.4-meter (23 by 14 ft) variant. The designs incorporated additional external components, including radial docking ports, radiators, batteries, and communications antennas. NASA selected the smaller design, citing compatibility with existing Cygnus components and the ability to accelerate testing of life-support systems.

=== Construction ===
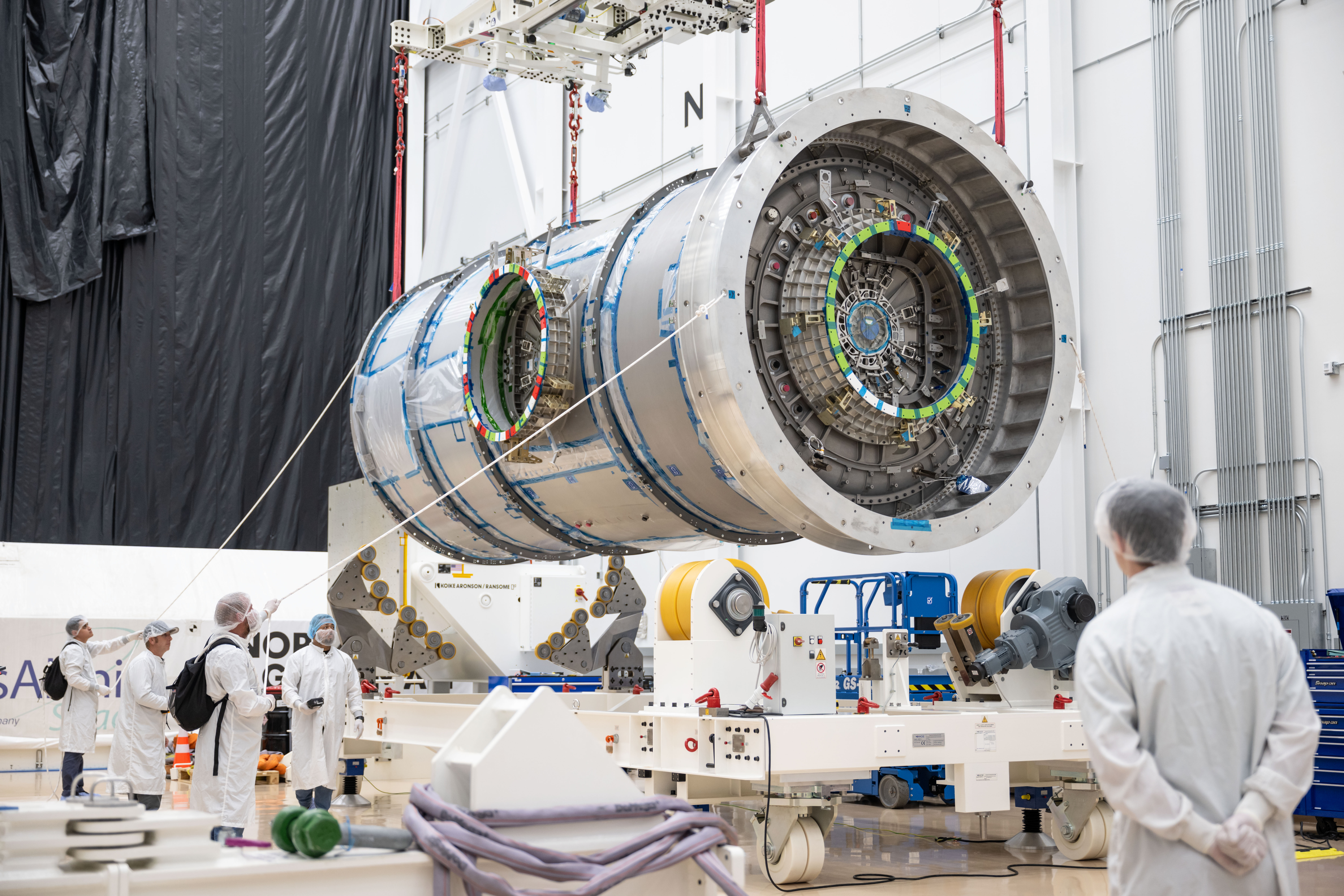
HALO being unloaded at Northrop Grumman's Gilbert, Arizona facility in 2025 for outfitting after being delivered from Thales Alenia

On June 5, 2020, NASA awarded Northrop Grumman a $187 million contract to complete the preliminary design of ALO module. At the same time, NASA executed a separate $935 million contract with Northrop Grumman for fabrication of the module and its integration with the Power and Propulsion Element (PPE), which is being developed by Maxar Technologies.

By mid-2024, HALO had reached a significant level of completion and entered structural stress testing at Thales Alenia Space facilities in Europe. These tests were successfully completed in October 2024, clearing the module for final preparations. In early 2025, Airbus Defence and Space delivered the Power Management and Distribution Subsystem (PMAD), a key electrical component housed within HALO.

=== Corrosion ===
Following delivery of the HALO module to the United States in April 2025 for final outfitting and integration, NASA reported the discovery of significant corrosion affecting both HALO and the International Habitation Module (I-HAB), which was also built by Thales Alenia Space. NASA Administrator Jared Isaacman indicated that addressing the issue may not be straightforward, stating that he was "not sure there is a deterministic approach to repair", and suggesting that remediation efforts would delay the module's readiness beyond 2030. He also questioned whether repair efforts were "even warranted", in light of NASA's shifting focus to developing a lunar surface base.

Northrop Grumman characterized the corrosion as a "manufacturing irregularity" that could be repaired, while Thales Alenia Space described it as a "well-known metallurgical behavior". The company noted that similar conditions had been encountered in modules developed for the International Space Station, which have continued to operate reliably and exceeded their original design lifespans. The companies added that the issues can be resolved without threatening next steps.

=== Cancellation ===
In March 2026, NASA effectively killed the Lunar Gateway by shifting focus to developing a lunar surface base. At the time, it was not announced how or if HALO would be repurposed under this plan. In June 2026, Northrop Grumman told contractors for the HALO module to stop work and reassigned employees to other projects. Although it appeared NASA was moving away from repurposing HALO, the Northrop Grumman reiterated that it felt it was the most mature technology to support a deep space or lunar habitat.

== Design ==
The HALO will form an initial scaled-down habitation module. Its primary purpose will be to fulfill the life-support requirements of visiting crew on Orion spacecraft and a space to allow preparations for lunar landing departure. It will feature a functional pressurized volume providing sufficient command, control and data handling capabilities, energy storage and power distribution, thermal control, communications and tracking capabilities, two axial and up to two radial docking ports, stowage volume, environmental control and life-support systems to augment the Orion spacecraft and support a crew of four for at least 30 days. The exterior of the HALO module will feature body-mounted radiators (BMRs), batteries and communications antennae will be added. One axial docking port will connect to the International logistics and habitat module (I-HAB) and one radial docking port is allocated for use by the Human Landing System. Batteries will be provided by the Japan Aerospace Exploration Agency (JAXA). These will provide power to the module prior to the deployment of the Power and Propulsion Element (PPE) solar arrays and during occultation of the Sun by the Earth and Moon. The Canadian Space Agency will be providing interfaces and base point for use by Canadarm 3.

Cargo docking port
Solar Array	HLCS communications module	ERM observation port and fuel storage
PPE propulsion module	HALO logistics and habitat	I-HAB logistics and habitat	Orion docking port
Solar Array	HLS docking port

== Science ==
HALO will host three scientific packages at launch aimed at improving the understanding of space weather and prediction models. The NASA-built Heliophysics Environmental and Radiation Measurement Experiment Suite, the ESA-built European Radiation Sensors Array (ERSA), and the ESA-built Internal Dosimetry Array (IDA).

=== Heliophysics Environmental and Radiation Measurement Experiment Suite (HERMES) ===
HERMES will explore Earth's interaction with the solar wind and the behavior of the magnetotail. The hope is to build a better understanding on the causes of space-weather variability as driven by the Sun and modulated by the magnetosphere. The experiment Suite has three science goals: determine mechanisms of solar wind mass and energy transport; characterize energy, topology, and ion composition in the deep magnetotail; and establish observational capabilities of an on-board pathfinder payload measuring local space weather to support deep-space and long-term human exploration.

The suite will consist of four instruments. Fluxgate and Magneto-Inductive Magnetometers will measure Magnetic Field Vector. Built and supplied by Goddard Space Flight Center. Principal investigators from University of Michigan and Goddard Space Flight Center.

Miniaturized Electron pRoton Telescope (MERiT) to measure ion flux of energies between 1-190 MeV and electron flux of energies between 0.3 – 9 MeV. Built, supplied and operated by Goddard Space Flight Center.

Electron Electrostatic Analyser (EEA) is an electron spectrometer and will measure flux, density, speed and temperature of lower energy electrons of less than 30 KeV. It is built, supplied and operated by Goddard Space Flight Center.

Solar Prove Analyser (SPAN-I) is an ion spectrometer. It will measure the flux, density, speed, temperature and type of low energy ions with energies less than 40KeV. SPAN-I will be supplied and operated by University of California, Berkeley.

=== European Radiation Sensors Array (ERSA) ===
The ESA built European Radiation Sensors Array (ERSA) will measure the effect and impact of the solar wind on astronauts and equipment. The suite will include the Influence sur les Composants Avancés des Radiations de l'Espace (ICARE-NG) to measure ionizing radiation; and the European Active Dosimeter to measure radiation energies.

=== Internal Dosimetry Array (IDA) ===
The ESA-built Internal Dosimetry Array (IDA) will be one of the first European (ESA) contribution to the Lunar Gateway station. IDA aims to be operated on board the US HALO module developed by Northrop Grumman under NASA leadership. IDA will combine the best state of the art European dosimetry system and a Japanese system (provided by JAXA) including TRITEL2 REMRED's own monitor as well in order to provide scientific radiation data. IDA instruments provide, based on measurements of energy deposition and particle track analysis, particle fluxes and fluences, LET spectra, mean quality factors, absorbed dose and dose equivalent rates, as well as integrated absorbed dose and dose equivalent from the charged particle component of space radiation.

== See also ==
- Zarya (Functional Cargo Block; FGB/ФГБ), the International Space Station power, propulsion, control, and storage, module
