= Advanced Space =

Advanced Space, LLC is a private spacecraft technology company headquartered in Westminster, Colorado. Advanced Space offers expertise in spacecraft mission design, satellite navigation, machine learning, and systems engineering. The company designed and managed the CAPSTONE small satellite mission, the first commercial lunar orbiter mission, which launched in 2022 and has been operating in cislunar space ever since.

== History ==
Advanced Space was founded as Geryon Space Technologies in 2011 by Bradley Cheetham, Jeffrey Parker, and Darrell David Cain. The name of the company was changed to Advanced Space in 2013. Pursuing the CAPSTONE mission concept, which was based on earlier work at the University of Colorado Boulder by students of Professor George Born under the name Linked Autonomous Interplanetary Satellite Orbit Navigation (LIAISON), was a driving factor in the company’s genesis. The CAPSTONE mission was pitched as a demonstration of LiAISON but also as a pathfinder for NASA’s Lunar Gateway space station, and was funded by NASA through the Small Business Innovation Research (SBIR) program. The early team was made up of alumni from the Colorado Center for Astrodynamics Research and the NASA Jet Propulsion Laboratory (JPL).

Alongside CAPSTONE, Advanced Space has been involved with the design and operations of several noteworthy cislunar and interplanetary missions including the Emirates Mars Mission (EMM), the Emirates Mission to the Asteroid Belt (EMA), the Escape and Plasma Acceleration and Dynamics Explorers (ESCAPADE) mission, the Space weather Observations at L1 to Advance Readiness – 1 (SOLAR-1) mission, and the Nancy Grace Roman Space Telescope, as well as the NASA Artemis and Moonbase programs. Advanced Space is also the prime contractor for the forthcoming Oracle-P mission in partnership with the Air Force Research Laboratory (AFRL).

In 2026, Advanced Space and NASA announced the CAPSTONE 02 mission which will send two 400-kg satellites to lunar orbit for various technology demonstrations including lunar Rendezvous and Proximity Operations (RPO).
