= Space Reactor‑1 Freedom =

Proposed nuclear-powered spacecraft

Space Reactor-1 Freedom
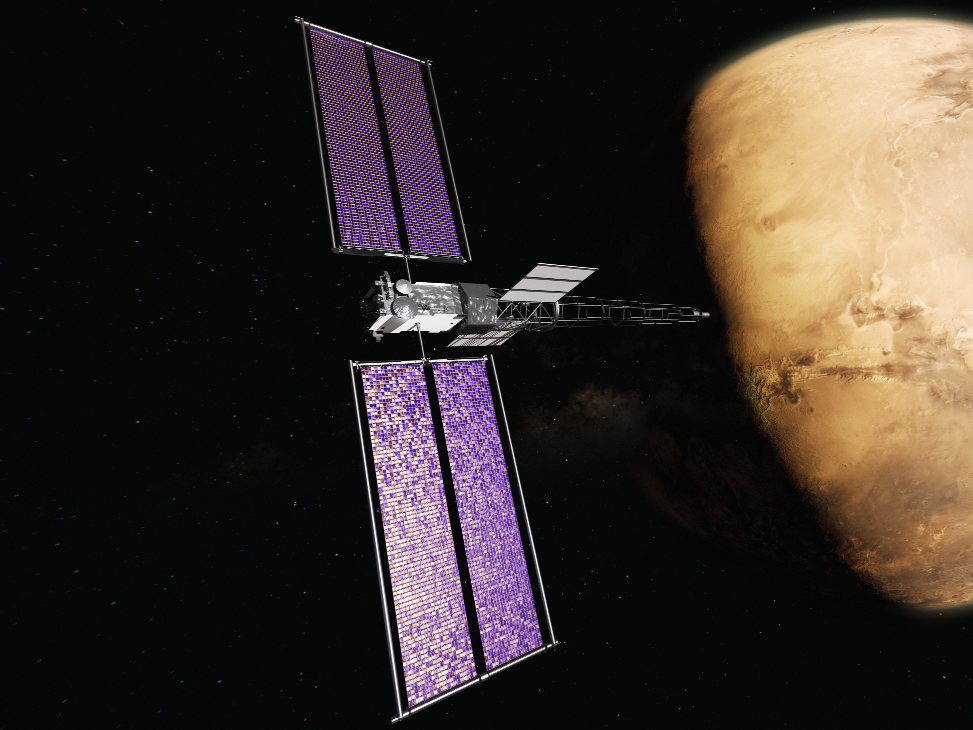
- Rendering of Space Reactor-1 Freedom
- Mission type: Nuclear electric propulsion technology demonstration
- Operator: NASA

Spacecraft properties
- Manufacturer: PPE: Intuitive Machines; Thrusters: Aerojet Rocketdyne, Busek and NASA
- Power: >20 kW of electrical power from reactor

Start of mission
- Launch date: 2028 (planned)

Space Reactor-1 Freedom (SR-1) is a pathfinder NASA spacecraft intended to be the first nuclear fission-powered interplanetary mission and to demonstrate nuclear electric propulsion (NEP) in deep space. Announced in March 2026, the spacecraft would combine a closed Brayton cycle fission reactor generating more than 20 kW of electrical power with the Power and Propulsion Element (PPE) previously developed for the Lunar Gateway space station.

== Proposed technical specifications ==
The fission reactor is to be fueled by high-assay low-enriched uranium (HALEU), using uranium dioxide fuel encased in a boron carbide radiation shield, and will use existing designs for the Department of Energy's research reactors.

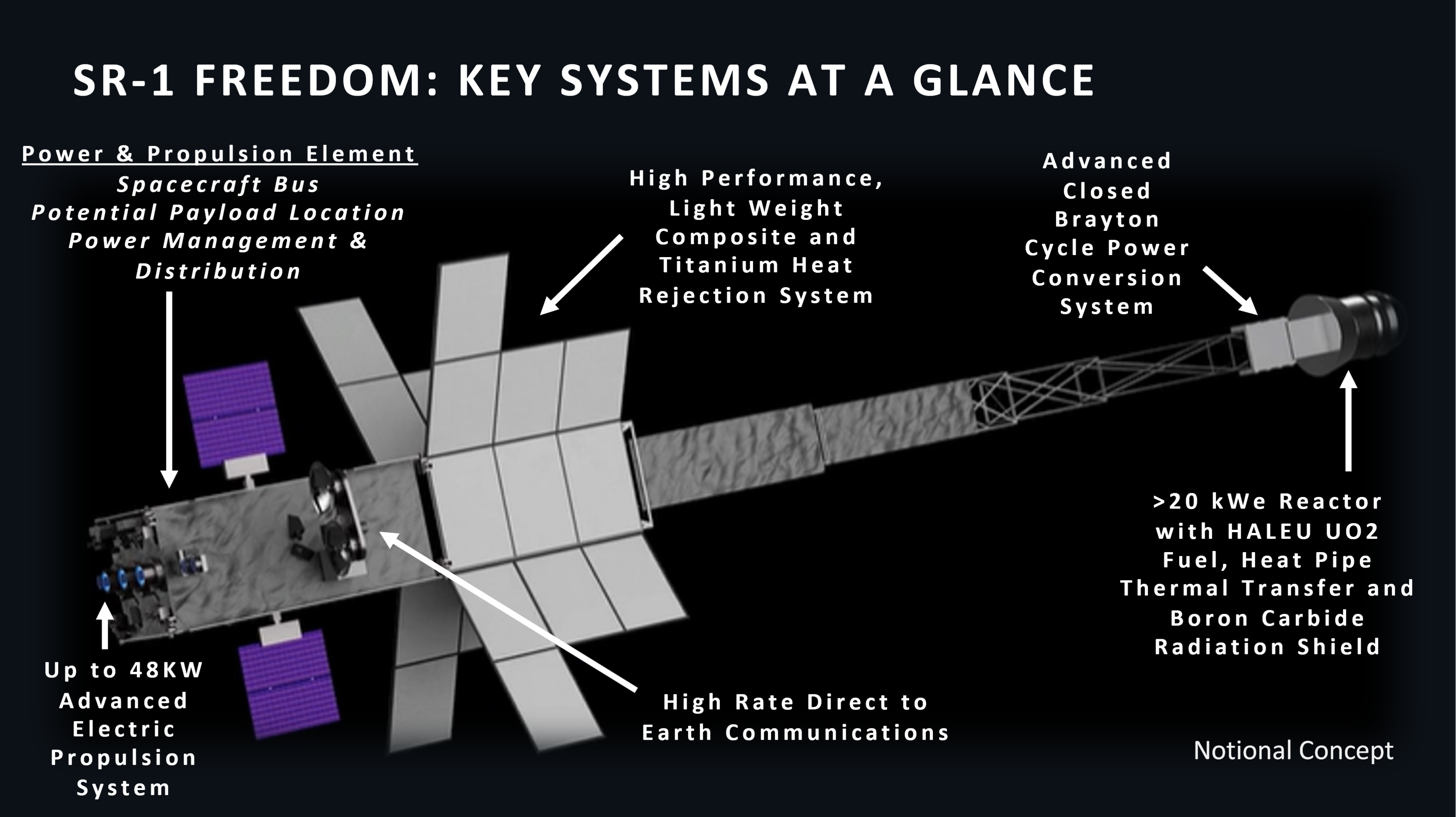
Configuration of SR-1 with the PPE to left and the reactor to right

For propulsion, the PPE is equipped with four 6 kilowatt (kW) Hall-effect thrusters built by Busek and three 12 kW Advanced Electric Propulsion System Hall-effect thrusters developed by NASA and Aerojet Rocketdyne.

== Proposed missions ==
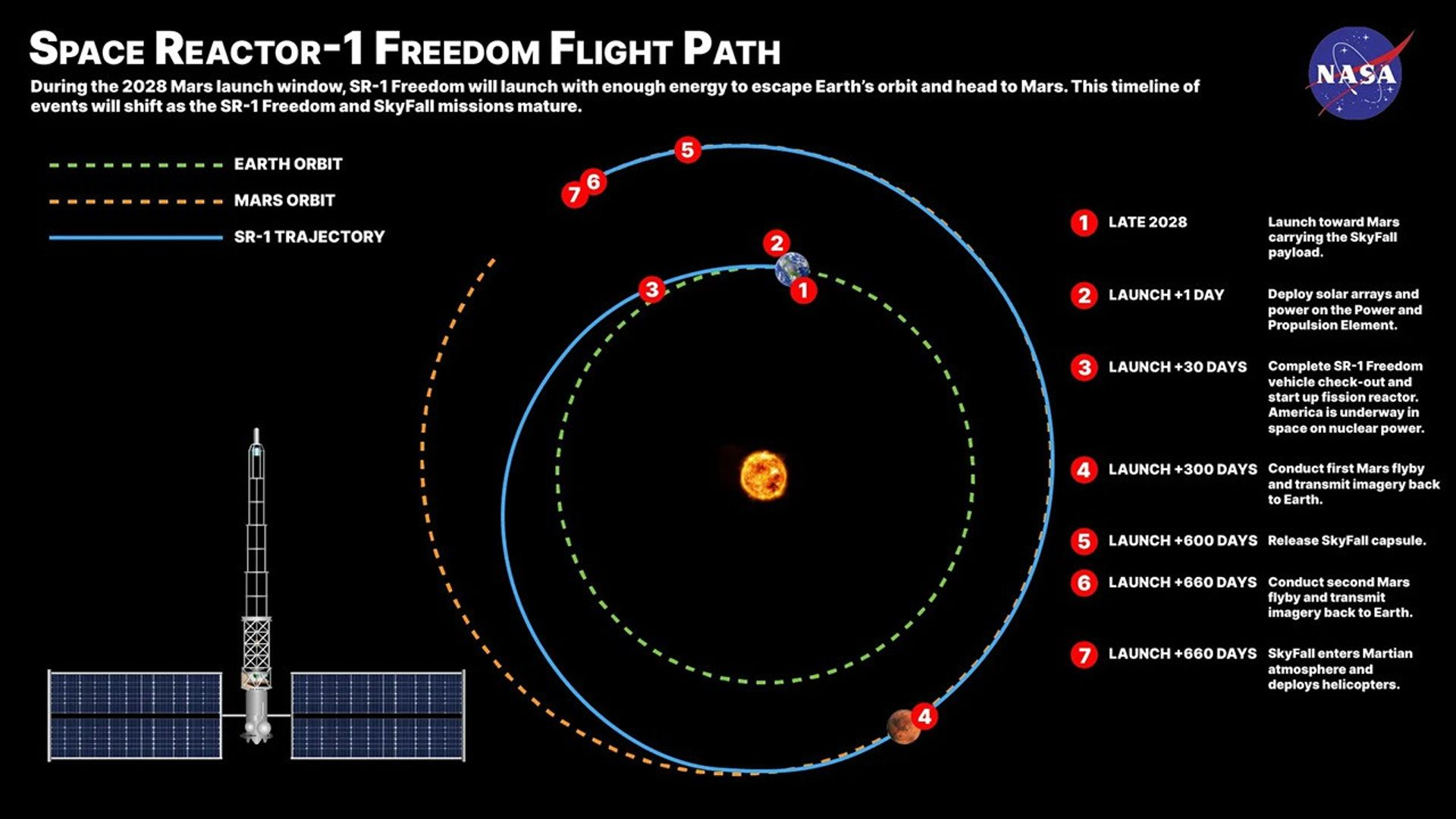
NASA’s Space Reactor-1 Freedom mission concept flight path illustrates the spacecraft’s journey to Mars, including launch, reactor startup, multiple Mars flybys, and deployment of the SkyFall payload during the mission.

SR-1 is proposed for launch in December 2028 on a trajectory to make two flybys of Mars. It will demonstrate the technology to potentially reduce travel time, but will not at this size be significantly faster than previous probes. At Mars it would deploy the Skyfall payload—an entry capsule (housed between the truss and PPE), carrying three Ingenuity-class helicopters to scout potential landing sites for future human missions and survey subsurface water ice.

The mission, jointly sponsored by NASA and the United States Department of Energy, is intended to demonstrate nuclear propulsion and power technologies for sustained exploration beyond the Moon, including future missions to Mars and the outer Solar System. Data from SR-1 is also expected to support development of Lunar Reactor-1 (LR-1), a fission surface power (FSP) system designed to provide continuous energy for a lunar base during periods without sunlight.

== Funding and management ==
The FY2027 presidential budget request gave little to no prominence to SR-1; however, in an April 3, 2026, message to NASA employees, Administrator Jared Isaacman listed “launching SR-1 Freedom” among NASA’s priorities upon responding to that request, while Sen. Jerry Moran (R-KS), the chair of the Senate appropriations subcommittee that funds NASA, said he opposed proposed cuts to parts of NASA’s budget and would seek to fund the agency at FY2026 levels, particularly nuclear propulsion. At the same time, the U.S. Office of Science and Technology Policy issued NSTM-3, the National Initiative for American Space Nuclear Power. The memorandum directed NASA to initiate a program for a mid-power space reactor with a FSP variant and an option for a space variant for an NEP demonstration, and to prioritize integrated FSP and NEP designs using common elements, including reactor hardware and nuclear fuel to be potentially used on SR-1. SpacePolicyOnline reported that the memorandum focused principally on FSP and NEP for NASA and directed work on common NEP/NTP components for initial use on a potential NEP demonstrator.

In May 2026, the House Appropriations Committee's fiscal year 2027 Commerce, Justice, Science, and Related Agencies report recommended $50 million for nuclear electric nuclear propulsion development and stated that NEP would play a critical role in advancing SR-1 with $10 million. Later that month, NASA Administrator Jared Isaacman said NASA would centralize authority for space nuclear activities under a Space Reactor Office, direct that office to prepare an integrated program plan for SR-1 and LR-1 within 60 days, and sustain common enabling technologies for SR-1, LR-1, NTP, and future missions.

On June 2, 2026, NASA announced it is working on a streamlined management approach allowing them to go faster. On September 1, 2026, Ars Technica reported that NASA's cost estimated for the SR-1 is $2.1 billion without the helicopters.
