= Sample Transfer Arm =

European robotic arm for space exploration

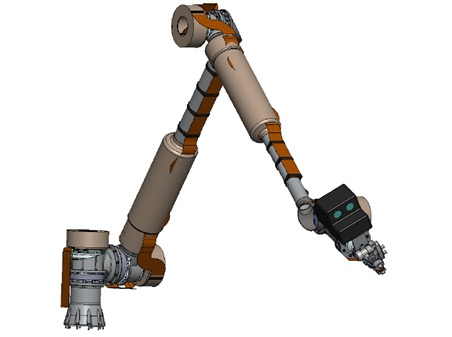
- Operator: European Space Agency
- Manufacturer: (Italy) Leonardo S.p.A.
- Instrument type: Robotic arm

Host spacecraft
- Spacecraft

The Sample Transfer Arm is a robotic arm developed by the European Space Agency (ESA) for use in uncrewed spaceflight. The instrument has seven joints comprising a shoulder, elbow, and wrist. It can extend up to 2.4 metres and manipulate objects with millimetre precision. It is equipped with two cameras, an array of sensors, and computational capacity which give it certain amount of autonomy needed when operating far from Earth. It was built by a European consortium led by the Italian company Leonardo.

The arm was originally intended for use on the Sample Retrieval Lander, part of the NASA-ESA Mars Sample Return mission. It would recover samples, delivered by a rover or helicopter, and load them into the Sample Return Capsule in the Ascent Vehicle. However, the Mars sample return mission was cancelled by NASA in 2026 and ESA began exploring options for using the instrument on another mission, possibly to the Lunar surface.

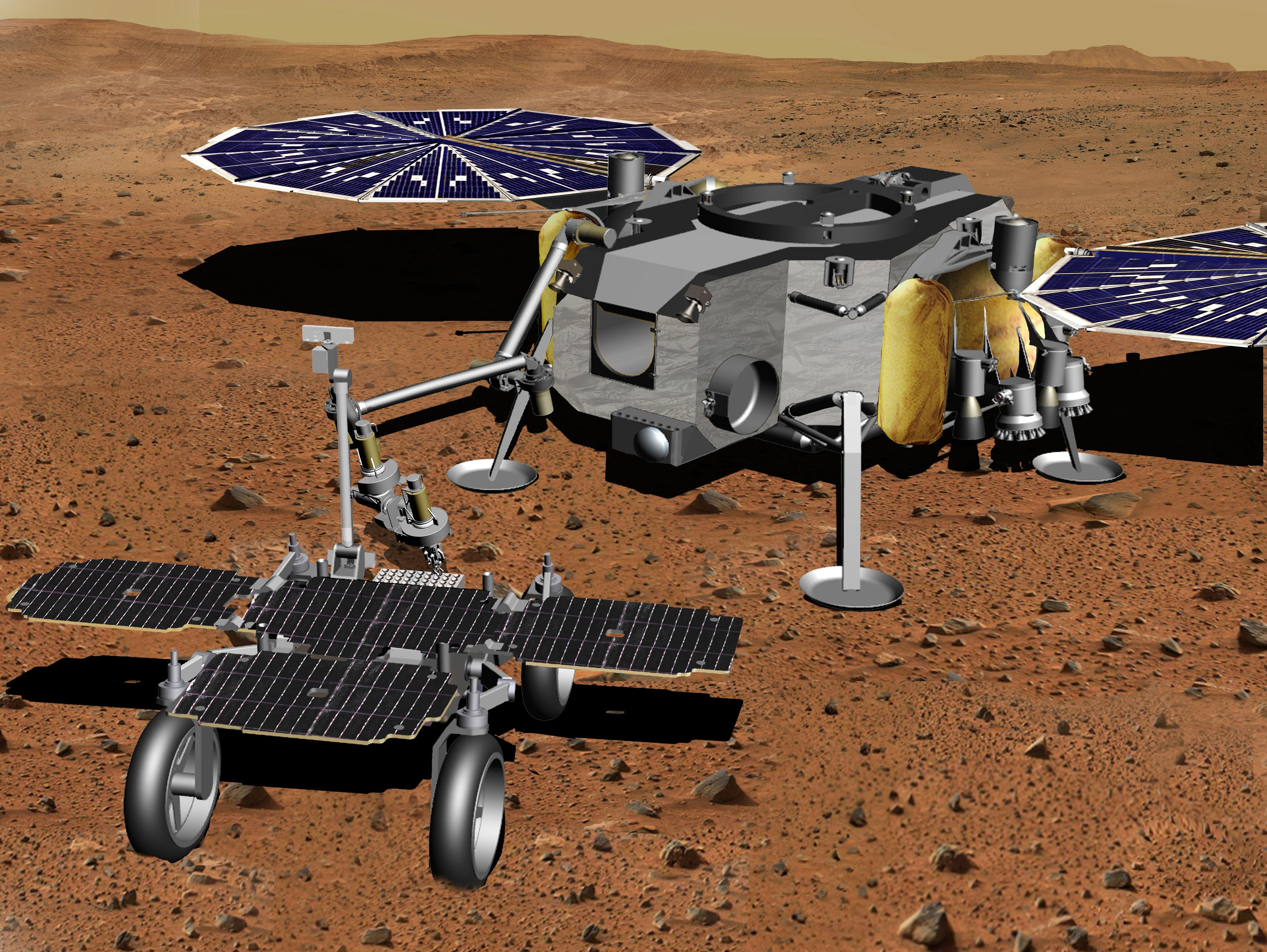
Concept of the arm's operations within NASA-ESA Mars Sample Return (2020)

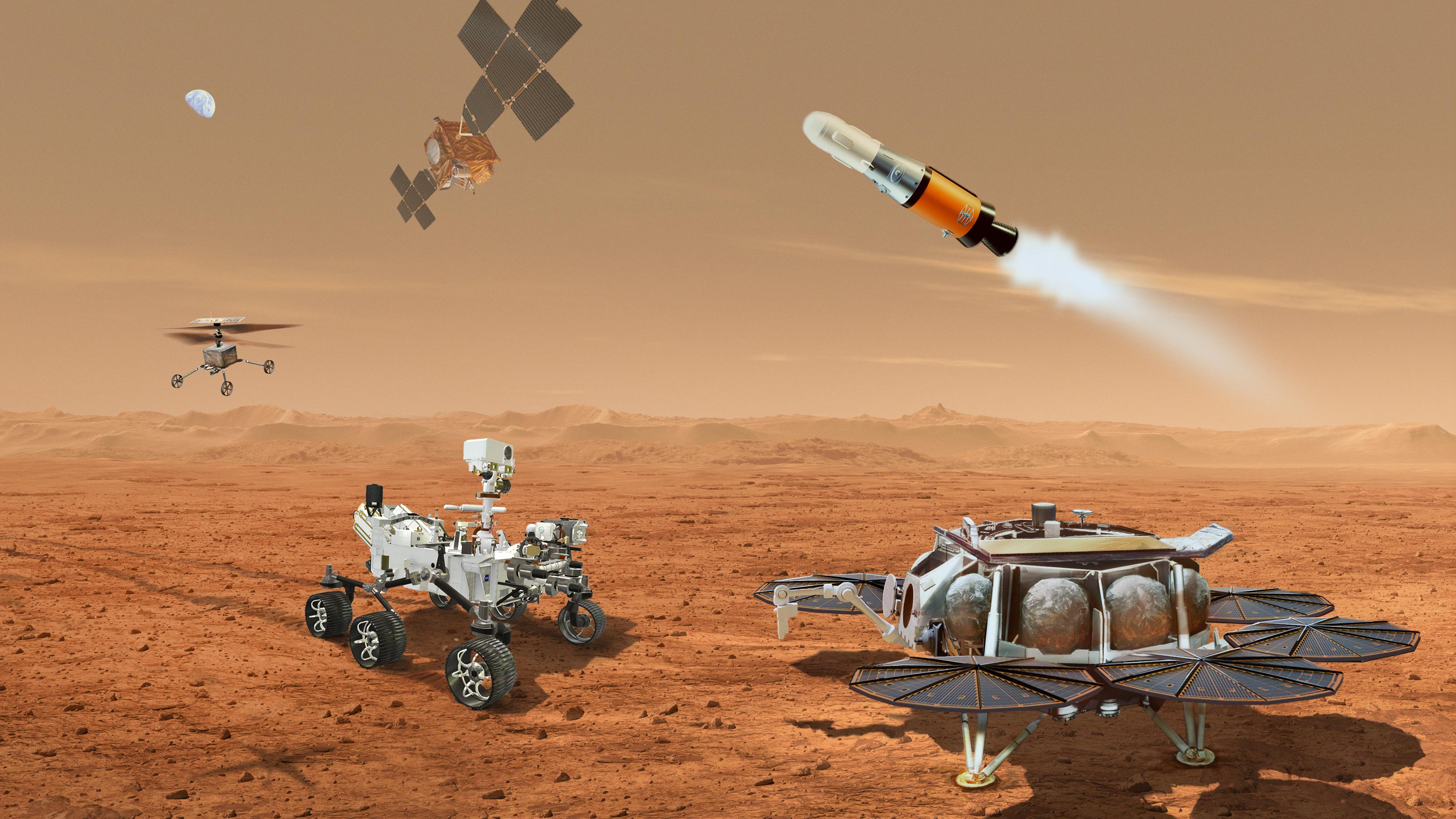
Concept of the arm's operations within NASA-ESA Mars Sample Return (2022)

== Consortium ==
Apart from Leonardo, other companies involved in the arm's development are:

- 3D PLUS (France)
- AVS Added Value Solutions (Spain)
- ALTER Technology (France)
- COMOTI (Romania)
- EMTech Space (Greece)
- GMV Aerospace & Defence SAU (Spain)
- GMV Innovating Solution (Romania)
- Maxon (Switzerland)
- S.A.B. Aerospace s.r.o. (Czech Republic)
- The Danish Technological Institute (Denmark)
- OHB Italia (Italy)

== See also ==
- List of European Space Agency programmes and missions
- Mars sample-return mission – Mars mission to collect rock and dust samples
- Terrae Novae – European programme for human spaceflight and robotic space exploration
- European Robotic Arm – Robotic arm installed on the ISS
- Canadarm – Robotic arm used on Space Shuttles
- Mobile Servicing System – Robotic system on board the International Space Station
- Strela – Robotic arm installed on the ISS
- Lunar Link – European lunar communications hardware
