= Gateway Logistics Services =

NASA uncrewed spaceflight program for the Lunar Gateway space station

The Gateway Logistics Services (acronymized as GLS) was a planned series of uncrewed spaceflights to the cancelled Lunar Gateway space station, with the purpose of providing logistical services to the Gateway. Overseen by NASA Kennedy Space Center’s Deep Space Logistics Office, the flights were to be operated by commercial providers, contracted by the agency in support of crewed expeditions to the Gateway made under the Artemis program. As of March 2023, SpaceX was the only company contracted to provide the services.

== Development ==
The Gateway Logistics Services were modeled after previous ventures by NASA with commercial providers, such as the Commercial Resupply Services to the International Space Station and the Commercial Crew Program. Through the services, the Gateway will be provided with supplies, scientific instruments, and elements of the Artemis program architecture. NASA first sought input from the private sector on a procurement framework through a Sources Sought Notice published in October 2018. After a framework was approved by the United States Congress in December 2018, the agency published a draft for its request for proposals for resupply services to the Gateway on June 14, 2019. Shortly following an industry day at the Kennedy Space Center for potential bidders on June 26, the final version of the request was published on August 16. Procuring fixed-price contracts worth US$7 billion in total over fifteen years, the request detailed requirements for American commercial providers to be able to deliver spacecraft capable of carrying at least 3,400 kilograms (7,500 pounds) of pressurized cargo and 1,000 kilograms (2,200 pounds) of unpressurized cargo to the Gateway on each flight, and disposing of an equivalent mass at the end of the flight. Spacecraft were also required to be able to last up to a year docked at the Gateway; the draft request originally required durability of three years, though it was reduced to allow for "commercial innovation". The request also offered a minimum of two missions to the Gateway for potential bidders. Sierra Nevada Space Systems publicized their interest during a November 2019 event celebrating progress on their Dream Chaser Cargo System, with the company's Vice President, Steve Lindsey, noting that spacecraft met the requirements for pressurized and unpressurized cargo mass. In March 2020, NASA announced SpaceX as the first GLS contractor, with the company simultaneously unveiling the Dragon XL spacecraft to be used in their flights to the Gateway. The spacecraft is capable of carrying 5,000 kilograms (11,000 pounds) of pressurized and unpressurized cargo in total to the Gateway.

== Missions ==
The Gateway Logistics Services are managed by the Kennedy Space Center's Gateway Logistics Element, which began operation in late 2019. Each mission procured under the services is expected to last at least six months docked at the Gateway. SpaceX will embark on at least two missions to the Gateway – lasting between six and twelve months each – using its Dragon XL spacecraft, delivering scientific instruments and sample collection tools that astronauts will utilize during extravehicular activities on the lunar surface, along with other supplies for both Gateway and HLS crew. Dragon XL will be launched to the Gateway via the Falcon Heavy rocket, with the first mission expected to launch before Artemis IV in 2028.

== See also ==
- Commercial Lunar Payload Services
- Human Landing System
