= External Active Thermal Control System =

International Space Station thermal control system

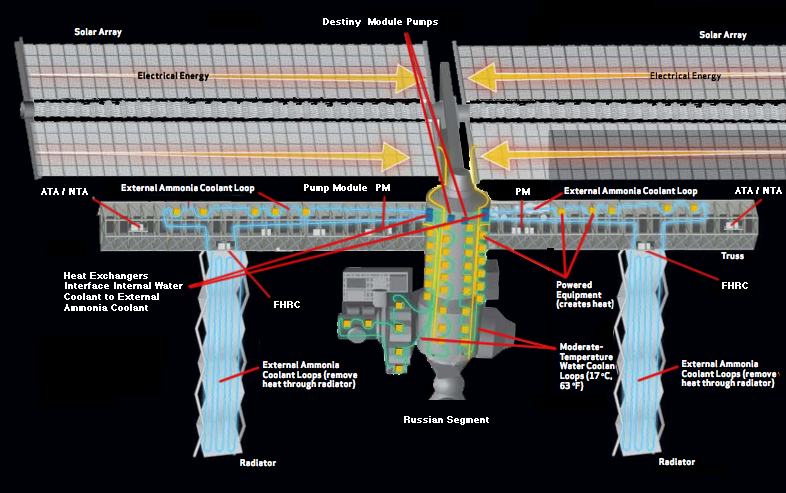
ISS External Active Thermal Control System (EATCS) diagram

The International Space Station (ISS) External Active Thermal Control System (EATCS) is a temperature system on the ISS that maintains a thermal equilibrium when the ISS environment or heat load exceeds the capabilities of the passive control systems.

== See also ==
- International Space Station (ISS)
- Electrical system of the International Space Station
- Environmental Control and Life Support System (ECLSS)
