= Power and Propulsion Element =

Planned component of a Mars-mission craft

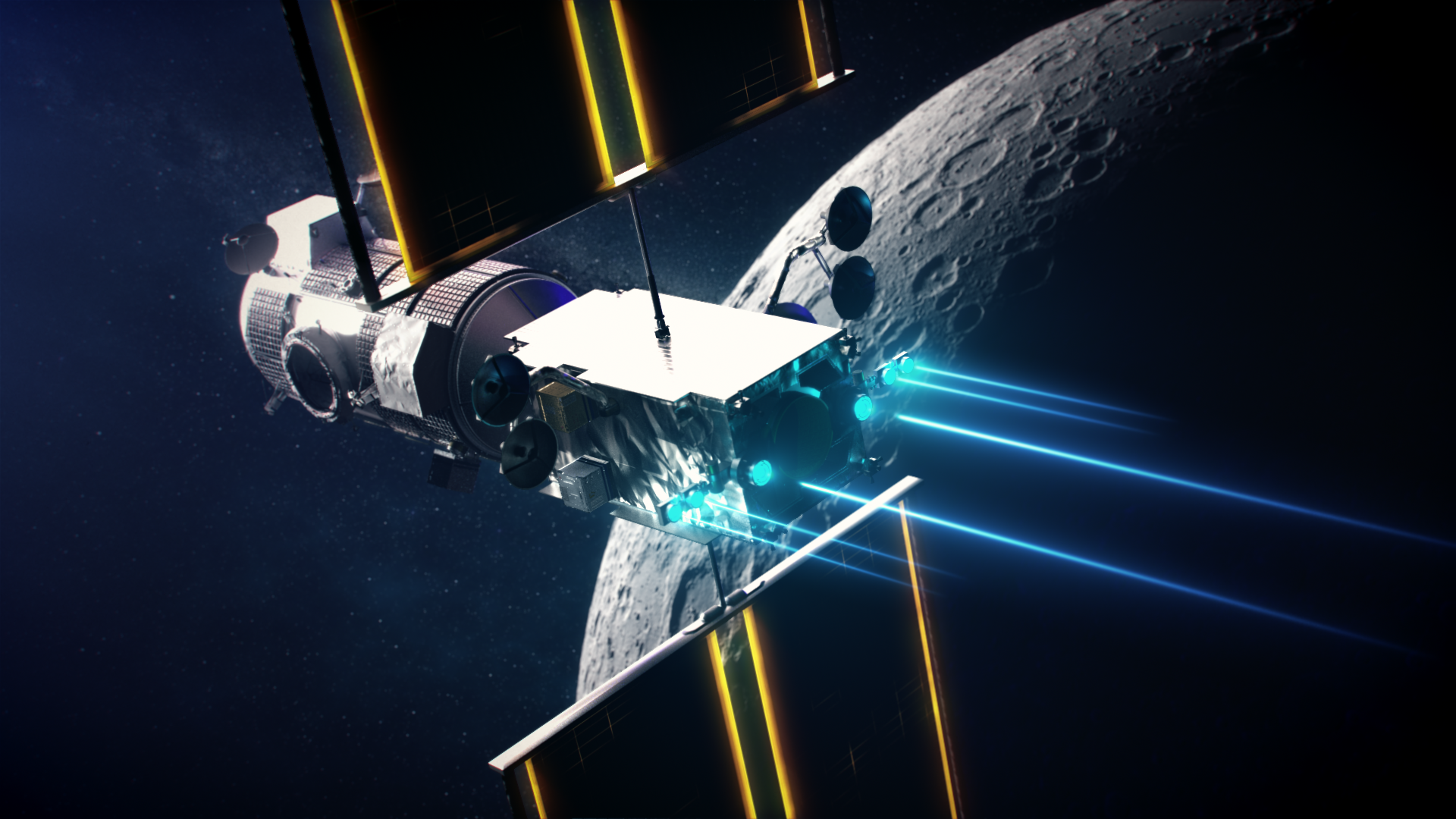
- Artist's impression of the PPE, attached to HALO, firing its engines in lunar orbit.
- Names: PPE; Asteroid Redirect Vehicle
- Mission type: Ion thruster propulsion module
- Operator: NASA
- Mission duration: 15 years (planned)

Spacecraft properties
- Spacecraft: PPE
- Manufacturer: Lanteris Space Systems
- Launch mass: 5,000 kg (11,000 lb)
- Power: 60 kW

Start of mission
- Launch date: December 2028 (planned)

The Power and Propulsion Element (PPE), previously known as the Asteroid Redirect Vehicle propulsion system, is a planned element of the Space Reactor‑1 Freedom (SR-1 Freedom) spacecraft. Developed by Lanteris Space Systems for NASA, PPE will use ion thrusters for nuclear electric propulsion supplemented by separate, higher-thrust bipropellant chemical propulsion.

The PPE development effort started in 2013 at the Jet Propulsion Laboratory as a part of the Asteroid Redirect Mission (ARM), but is now managed by the NASA John H. Glenn Research Center. The PPE was designed to have a launch mass of 5,000 kg (11,000 lb) with propellant accounting for half that mass and the capability to generate 50 kW of solar electric power using Roll Out Solar Arrays for its Hall-effect thrusters, which can be supplemented by chemical propulsion.

When ARM was cancelled, the solar electric propulsion was repurposed as the PPE for the Lunar Gateway. The PPE was designed to be able to transfer the reusable Gateway to lunar orbit and serve as the communications center of the Gateway. NASA originally planned to integrate PPE with the HALO module and launch them together on a Falcon Heavy no earlier than 2027.

In March 2026, NASA announced that PPE would be repurposed as the propulsion element of the nuclear-powered SR-1 Freedom spacecraft.

== Development ==
=== Asteroid Redirect Vehicle bus ===
The Asteroid Redirect Vehicle was a robotic, high performance solar electric spacecraft for the Asteroid Redirect Mission (ARM). The mission was to send the spacecraft to a near-Earth asteroid and capture a multi-ton boulder from the surface with a grappling device. It would then transport the asteroid into orbit around the Moon where crewed missions to study it could be conducted more easily. The mission was cancelled in early 2017 and the spacecraft's propulsion segment became the Power and Propulsion Element (PPE) for the Deep Space Gateway, now known as the Gateway.

=== Reusable Space Tug missions ===
During the Asteroid Redirect Mission, space tug missions were proposed to separate Mars logistics that can spend a longer time in space than the crew into a separate mission, which could have reduced the costs by as much as 60% (if using advanced solar electric propulsion (ion engines)). They would also reduce the overall mission risk by enabling check-out of critical systems at Mars before the crew departs Earth. This way if something goes wrong in those logistics, the crew is not in danger and the hardware can simply be fixed or relaunched.

Not only would the solar electric propulsion (SEP) technologies and designs be applied to future missions, but the ARM spacecraft would be left in a stable orbit for reuse. The project had baselined any of multiple refueling capabilities. The asteroid-specific payload was at one end of the spacecraft bus, either for possible removal and replacement via future servicing, or as a separable, reusable spacecraft, leaving a qualified space tug in cislunar space. This made adaption for Gateway easy, as the propulsion system was already designed to be multi-mission reusable. When the ARM was cancelled however, development on the bus and any reusable tug ideas died, temporarily.

=== Power and Propulsion Element ===
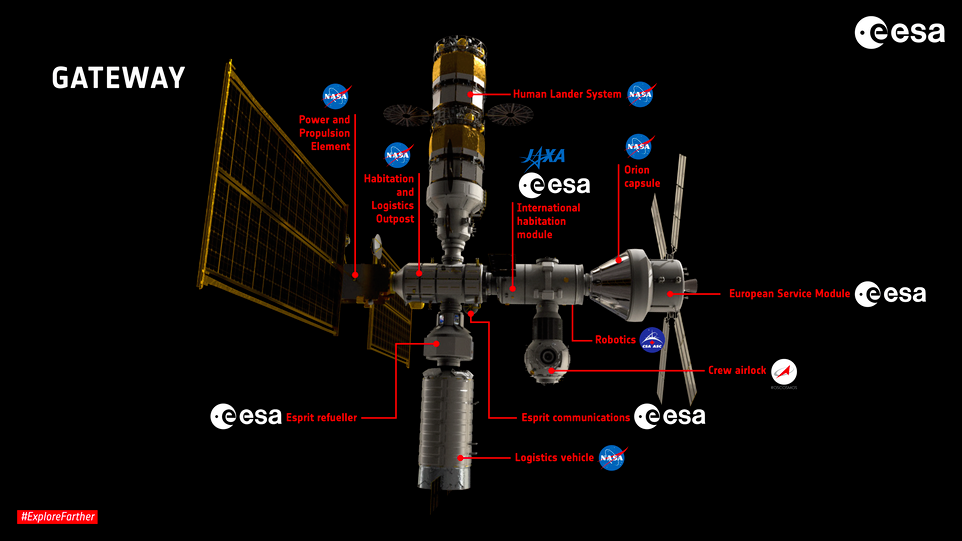
A diagram of the Gateway identifying the Power and Propulsion Element, along with the other modules planned.

In 2017, a year after the Artemis program came into existence, the ARM space tug/propulsion bus was repurposed as the main propulsion system for the Gateway space station. It officially became known as the Power and Propulsion Element or PPE. The PPE will be a smaller version of the Asteroid Redirect bus. In 2018, the Gateway was split off from Artemis as a separate program to allow a Moon landing by 2024 without having to wait for the Gateway to be completed.

=== Commercial company studies ===
On 1 November 2017, NASA commissioned 5 studies lasting four months into affordable ways to develop the Power and Propulsion Element (PPE), hopefully leveraging private companies' plans. These studies had a combined budget of US$2.4 million. The companies performing the PPE studies were Boeing, Lockheed Martin, Orbital ATK, Sierra Nevada and Space Systems/Loral. These awards are in addition to the ongoing set of NextSTEP-2 awards made in 2016 to study development and make ground prototypes of habitat modules that could be used on the Gateway as well as other commercial applications, so the Gateway is likely to incorporate components developed under NextSTEP as well.

=== Contract awarded ===
In May 2019, Lanteris Space Systems (as Maxar Technologies) was contracted by NASA to manufacture this module, which will also supply the station with electrical power and is based on Lanteris's Lanteris 1300 series satellite bus. The PPE will use Redwire's roll-out solar arrays for power generation, Busek 6 kW Hall-effect thrusters and NASA Advanced Electric Propulsion System (AEPS) Hall-effect thrusters. Maxar was awarded a firm-fixed price contract of US$375 million to build the PPE. Maxar's SSL business unit, previously known as Space Systems/Loral, will lead the project. Maxar stated they will receive help from Blue Origin and Draper Laboratory on the project, with Blue Origin assisting in human-rating and safety aspect while Draper will work with trajectory and navigation development. NASA is supplying the PPE with a S-band communications system to provide a radio link with nearby vehicles and a passive docking adapter to receive the Gateway's future Utilization Module. Maxar stated they are experienced dealing with high power components from making satellites. They did mention that their satellites are around 20 to 30 kilowatts, while the PPE will be about 60 kilowatts, but they say much of the technology they have already developed will still be applicable. After a one-year demonstration period, NASA would then "exercise a contract option to take over control of the spacecraft". Its expected service time is about 15 years.

=== Integration with HALO ===
As originally planned, PPE would implement the passive mode International Docking System Standard (IDSS) docking port. This meant that any spacecraft implementing active IDSS could theoretically dock to the PPE, such as Orion, Dragon 2, Dream Chaser, and Boeing Starliner. Maxar completed a system requirements review of this design in 2019.

In 2020 NASA introduced new requirements, including integration of PPE and HALO before launch. PPE thus does not need to dock with HALO in space, and its docking port was eliminated. Thus it will no longer be able to undock from HALO. In February 2021 NASA contracted with SpaceX for launch of the integrated elements by a Falcon Heavy launch vehicle.

In mid 2024, the HALO module reached significant completion and entered into the stress test phase in Thales Alenia's facilities. Upon successful completion of the stress tests, it is planned to be shipped to the US Northrop Grumman facilities to undergo final launch preparation and integration with the Power and Propulsion Element.

=== SR-1 Freedom ===
In March 2026, NASA announced the indefinite suspension of the Gateway program. PPE was repurposed as the propulsion element of the nuclear-powered Space Reactor‑1 Freedom spacecraft.

=== PPE construction ===
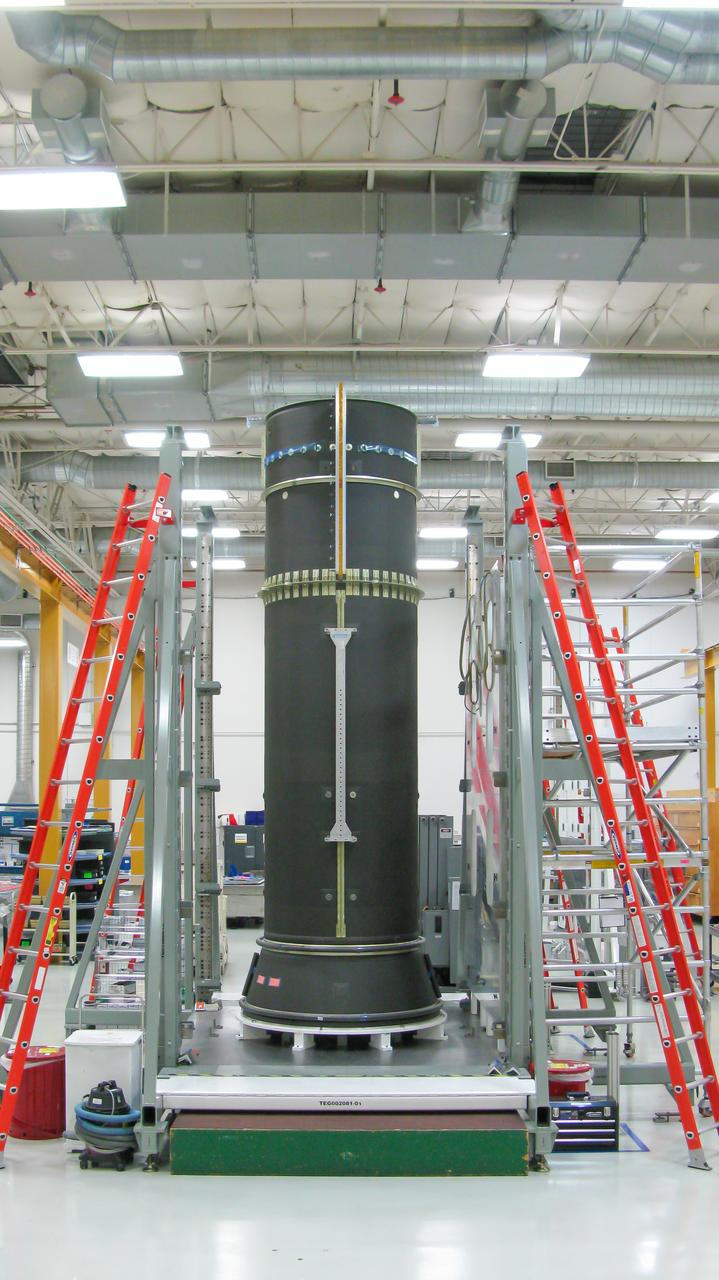
The central component of the PPE module.

- In 2025, the solar array which provides power to the module successfully passed testing.
- On November 4, 2025, Intuitive Machines announced that it would buy Lanteris Space Systems.
- In early 2026, the power systems of PPE were turned on successfully for the first time at the Lanteris Space Systems facility.

== See also ==
- Zarya (Functional Cargo Block; FGB/ФГБ), the International Space Station power, propulsion, control, and storage, module
- Artemis Program
