= Lunar Gateway =

Cancelled lunar orbital space station

Gateway
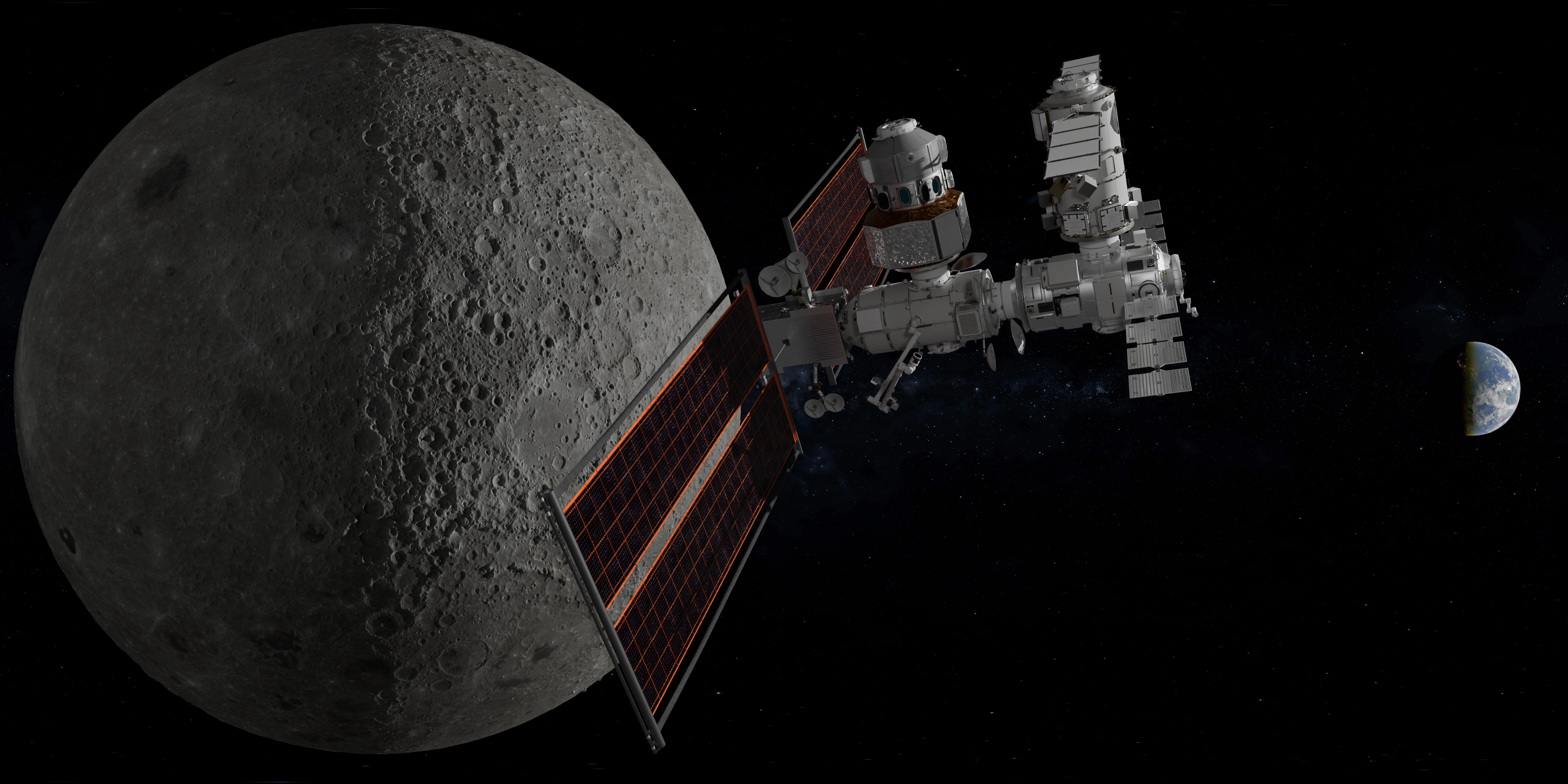
- Artist's rendering of the assembled Lunar Gateway, 2025 design

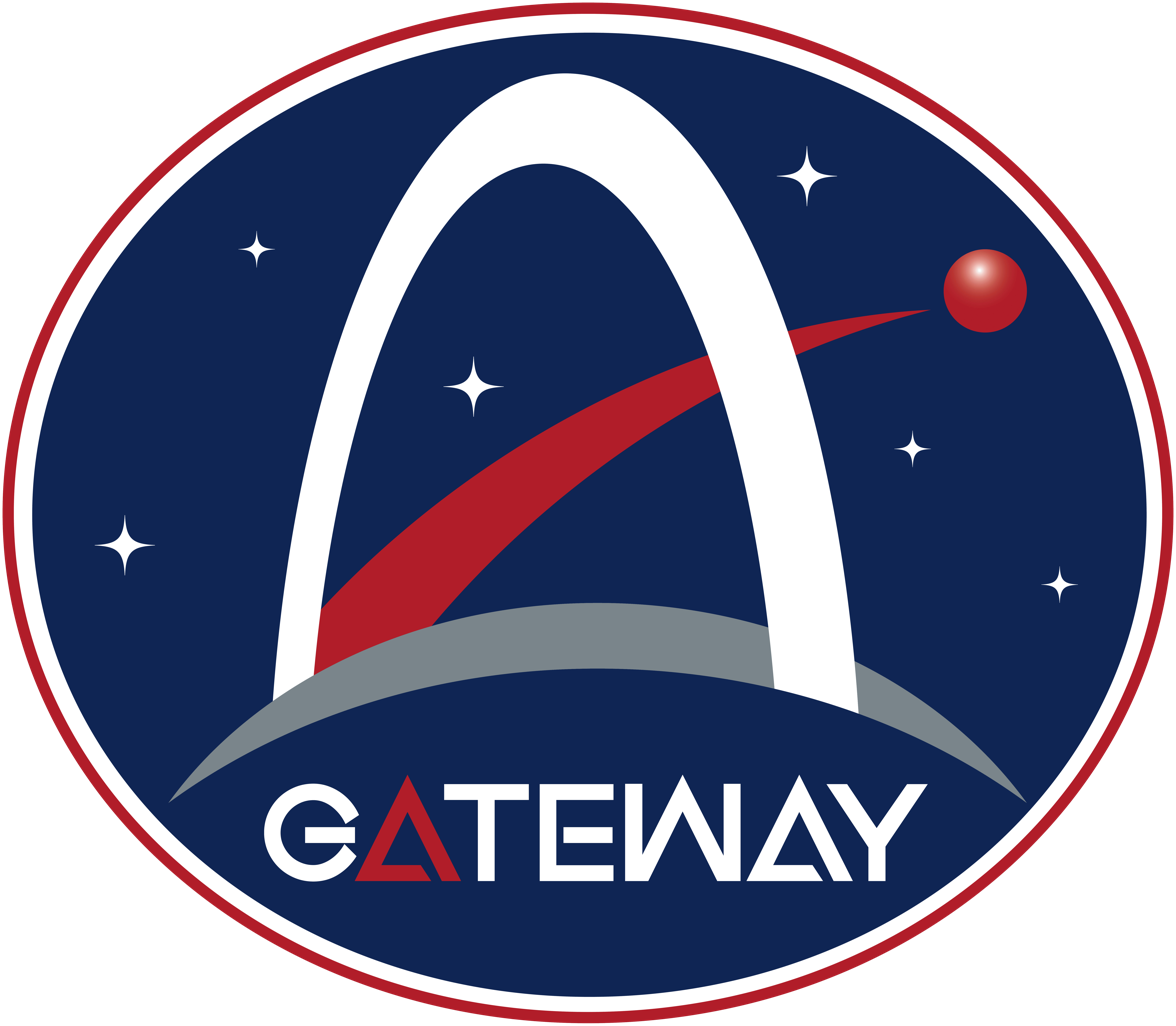

Station statistics
- Crew: 4 maximum (planned)
- Carrier rocket: Falcon Heavy; SLS Block 1B
- Mission status: Paused
- Mass: 63,000 kg (139,000 lb)
- Length: 20 m (66 ft) (total)
- Width: 19 m (62 ft) (total)
- Height: 43 m (141 ft) (total)
- Pressurised volume: ≥125 m^{3} (4,400 cu ft) (planned)
- Periselene altitude: 3,000 km (1,900 mi)
- Aposelene altitude: 70,000 km (43,000 mi)
- Orbital inclination: Polar near-rectilinear halo orbit (NRHO)
- Orbital period: ≈7 days
- Days in orbit: 15 years (planned)
- Configuration
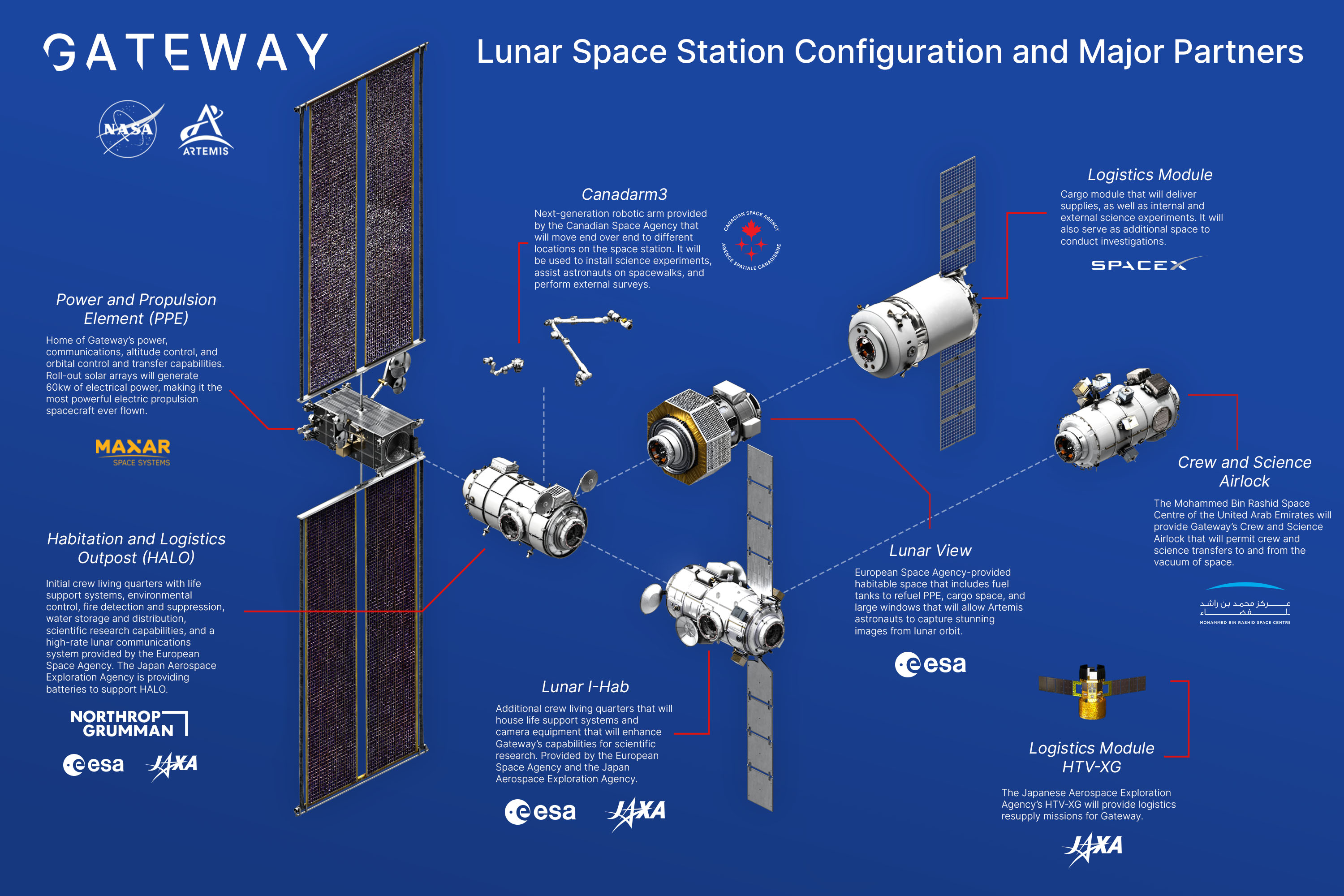
- Configuration as of 2024

The Lunar Gateway was a planned modular space station that would have been assembled in orbit around the Moon as part of the Artemis program. Derived from earlier concepts such as the Exploration Gateway Platform, it was developed from 2017 until 2026, when the leading space agency NASA shifted focus to developing a lunar surface base. The elements of Gateway are expected to be repurposed for other projects. Although all funding for the Lunar Gateway has been cut out of NASA's budget, administrator Jared Isaacman has routinely described Lunar Gateway as "paused" instead of cancelled.

The project was developed with international partners including the European Space Agency (ESA), the Japan Aerospace Exploration Agency (JAXA), the Canadian Space Agency (CSA), and the Mohammed Bin Rashid Space Centre (MBRSC) of the United Arab Emirates.

One of the technical drivers for Gateway was the limited propulsion capability of Orion's European Service Module used for the Artemis missions, which could not independently depart from low lunar orbit. A near-rectilinear halo orbit was selected, which reduced propulsion requirements. Gateway was intended to serve as a staging point where Orion could rendezvous with Human Landing System lunar landers, transfer crews, and support lunar surface missions. It was also planned to support communications, scientific research, and habitation for both crewed and robotic missions. Before its cancellation, it was expected to be the first space station beyond low Earth orbit and a potential staging point for future human missions to Mars.

Development plans called for two initial modules, the Power and Propulsion Element (PPE) and the Habitation and Logistics Outpost (HALO). Mid-way through the effort a plan emerged to launch them together on a commercial rocket. Subsequent elements were to be launched on Space Launch System (SLS) missions as co-manifested payloads with Orion and transferred to lunar orbit.

== Overview ==
The Gateway was expected to serve a central role in the Artemis program beginning in the latter half of the 2020s: providing docking ports and communications relays for Orion and lunar landers like Starship HLS, staging for surface missions to the lunar south polar region, and as a platform for crewed transfer. It would have also been used to evaluate concepts needed for long-duration deep-space missions.

Scientific research which would have been studied on Gateway were expected to include planetary science, astrophysics, Earth observation, space biology, heliophysics, and studies of human health and performance in deep-space environments.

Construction of the station's initial elements, including the Power and Propulsion Element (PPE) and the Habitation and Logistics Outpost (HALO), began in the early 2020s. The PPE and HALO were planned to launch together on a Falcon Heavy before Gateway's cancellation, and the first crewed visits were expected to be part of Artemis IV, which was scheduled to launch no earlier than September 2028. However, the NASA Office of Inspector General (OIG) reported that HALO was unlikely to be ready for launch until 2032.

== Name ==
The station was initially announced as the Deep Space Gateway (DSG) in 2017. NASA's FY 2019 budget request renamed the station as Lunar Orbital Platform-Gateway (LOP-G).

In November 2019, NASA officially designated the station as Gateway. The station's logo was inspired by the American landmark Gateway Arch in St. Louis.

== History ==
=== Background ===
The Apollo Command and Service Module was the first crewed lunar orbiting spacecraft performing dockings and crew transfers with another spacecraft, the Apollo Lunar Module. Lunar bases, like the first Tranquility Base as well as concepts for lunar bases have been the main focus of human presence at the Moon.

=== Studies ===
An earlier NASA proposal for a cislunar station had been made public in 2012 and was dubbed the Deep Space Habitat. That proposal led to funding in 2015 under the NextSTEP program to study the requirements of deep space habitats. In February 2018, it was announced that the NextSTEP studies and other ISS partner studies would help to guide the capabilities required of the Gateway's habitation modules. The solar electric Power and Propulsion Element (PPE) of the Gateway was originally a part of the now-canceled Asteroid Redirect Mission.

On 7 November 2017, NASA asked the global science community to submit concepts for scientific studies that could take advantage of the Deep Space Gateway's location in cislunar space. The Deep Space Gateway Concept Science Workshop was held in Denver, Colorado, from 27 February to 1 March 2018. This three-day conference was a workshop where 196 presentations were given for possible scientific studies that could be advanced through the use of the Gateway.

In 2018, NASA initiated the Revolutionary Aerospace Systems Concepts Academic Linkage (RASC-AL) competition for universities to develop concepts and capabilities for the Gateway. The competitors were asked to employ original engineering and analysis in one of four areas: "Gateway Uncrewed Utilization and Operations", "Gateway-Based Human Lunar Surface Access", "Gateway Logistics as a Science Platform", and "Design of a Gateway-Based Cislunar Tug". Teams of undergraduate and graduate students were asked to submit a response by 17 January 2019 addressing one of these four themes. NASA selected 20 teams to continue developing proposed concepts. Fourteen of the teams presented their projects in person in June 2019 at the RASC-AL Forum in Cocoa Beach, Florida, receiving a US$6,000 stipend to participate in the Forum. The "Lunar Exploration and Access to Polar Regions", from the University of Puerto Rico at Mayagüez, was the winning concept.

On 2 May 2018, NASA stated the International Space Exploration Coordination Group (ISECG), a non-binding coordination forum comprising 14 (at the time) worldwide space agencies, identified the Gateway as a critical component in expanding human presence to the Moon, Mars, and deeper into the Solar System.

In 2019 NASA established a Lunar Gateway Program Office at Johnson Space Center.

=== International participants ===
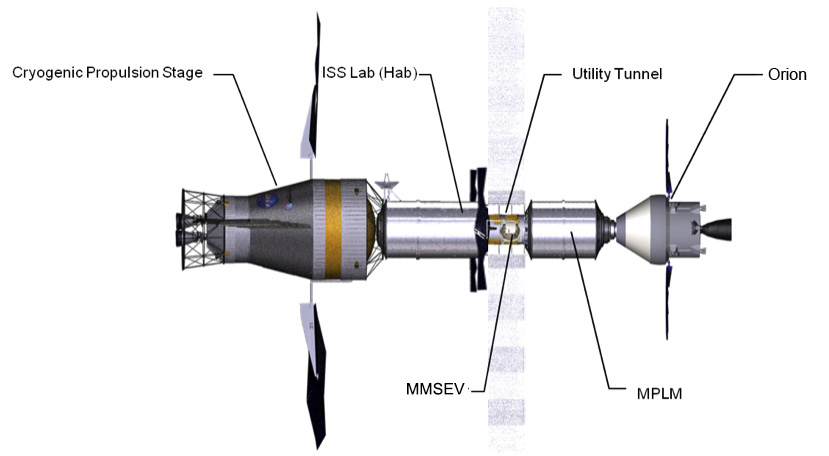
2012 concept for the Deep Space Habitat, consisting of a cryogenic propulsion stage, an ISS-derived habitat module, and a MPLM

On 27 September 2017, an informal joint statement on cooperation between NASA and Russia's Roscosmos was announced. However, in October 2020, Dmitry Rogozin, director general of Roscosmos, said that the program was too "U.S.-centric" for Roscosmos to participate. In January 2021, Roscosmos announced that it would not participate in the program.

Prior to cancellation, the Canadian Space Agency (CSA), the European Space Agency (ESA), Japan Aerospace Exploration Agency (JAXA) and Mohammed Bin Rashid Space Centre (MBRSC) were planning to participate in the Gateway project, contributing a robotic arm, refueling and communications hardware, habitation and research capacity, and an airlock module. These international elements were planned to launch after the initial NASA PPE and HALO elements were placed in lunar orbit, with some co-manifested with Artemis missions.

=== Power and propulsion ===
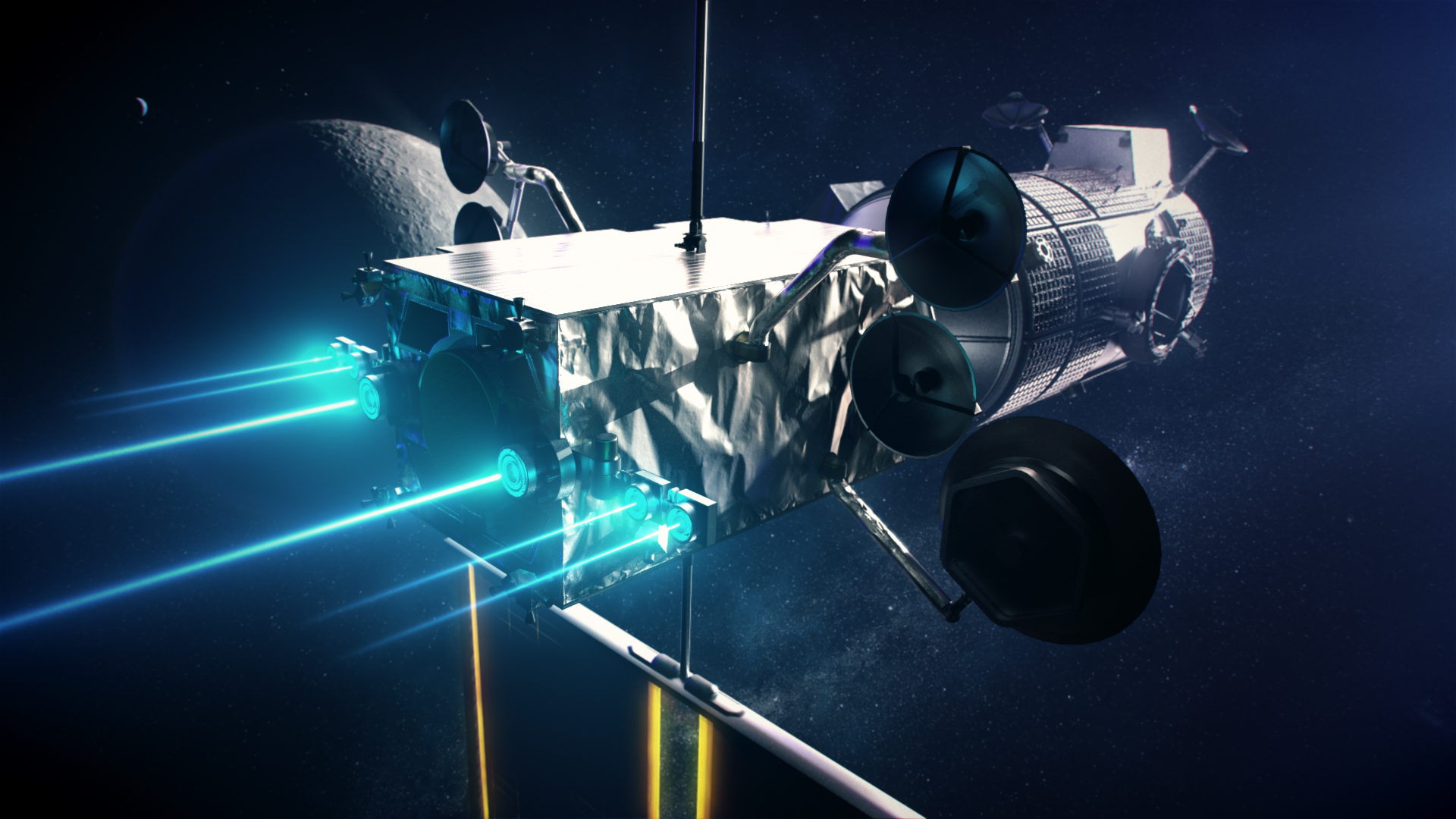
Power and Propulsion Element with HALO

On 1 November 2017, NASA commissioned five studies lasting four months into affordable ways to develop the Power and Propulsion Element (PPE), leveraging private companies' plans. These studies had a combined budget of US$2.4 million. The companies performing the PPE studies were Boeing, Lockheed Martin, Orbital ATK, Sierra Nevada, and Space Systems/Loral. These awards are in addition to the ongoing set of NextSTEP-2 awards made in 2016 to study development and make ground prototypes of habitat modules that could be used on the Gateway as well as other commercial applications, so Gateway was likely to incorporate components developed under NextSTEP as well. The PPE would have used four 6 kW BHT-6000 Busek Hall-effect thrusters and three 12 kW NASA/Aerojet Rocketdyne Advanced Electric Propulsion System (AEPS) Hall-effect thrusters for a total engine output fractionally under 50 kW. In 2019, the contract to manufacture the PPE was awarded to Maxar Technologies. After a one-year demonstration period, NASA intended to "exercise a contract option to take over control of the spacecraft". Its expected service time was about 15 years. In late 2023, it was reported that flight qualification testing was occurring on the thrusters for the Power and Propulsion Element.

=== Cancellation ===
On May 2, 2025, the second Trump administration released its fiscal year 2026 budget proposal, which proposed canceling the Lunar Gateway program, citing escalating costs, commercial alternatives, and shifting priorities, while allowing for repurposing of existing components. On July 4, 2025, President Donald Trump signed the One Big Beautiful Bill Act into law, providing $2.6 billion for the program and requiring at least $750 million annually from FY 2026 through FY 2028.

In early 2026, references to the station were reportedly removed from congressional funding legislation, and NASA administrator Jared Isaacman was reported to be considering restructuring the program toward a lunar surface base. In March 2026, NASA confirmed it would pause Gateway as designed and instead focus on a lunar surface base for 2029–2036, repurposing hardware where possible.

NASA also announced that the Power and Propulsion Element would be repurposed for Space Reactor-1 Freedom, a proposed nuclear electric propulsion spacecraft.

The NASA OIG reported that, at cancellation, NASA had spent nearly $1.9 billion on HALO (up from the $1.3 billion contract value), with delivery projected for October 2026, beyond the original May 2025 commitment, and that corrosion in its primary structure could have delayed delivery to July 2031.

The ESA stated that, despite cancellation, it expected to continue development of most planned hardware for Gateway. The Lunar I-Hab would proceed through critical design review before a repurposing decision would be made. Lunar Link was being assessed for reuse as a dedicated Lunar communications satellite. Development of Lunar View would slow with the agency saying it would keep the technology for future deep space exploration.

On March 24, 2026, while giving a speech at an agency event, NASA administrator Jared Isaacman stated that Gateway is “paused in its current form,” but not outright 'canceled.' Notably, this means that NASA is still obligated to complete all Gateway related contracts like Maxar’s $375 million PPE agreement. Although, the PPE will be used on Space Reactor‑1 Freedom. There is also no obligation on behalf of the Artemis Partners; ESA, JAXA, CSA, and the Mohammed Bin Rashid Space Centre, to cancel their development.

== Orbit and operations ==
The Gateway was to be deployed in a near-rectilinear halo orbit (NRHO) around the Moon. The eccentricity of the chosen NRHO takes the station within 1,500 km (930 mi) of the lunar north pole surface at closest approach, and as far away as 70,000 km (43,000 mi) over the lunar south pole, with a period of about 7 days.

Gateway was to be the first modular space station to be both human-rated, and autonomously operating most of the time in its early years, as well as being the first deep-space station, far from low Earth orbit. This would have been enabled by more sophisticated executive control software than on any prior space station, which would have monitored and controlled all systems. The high-level architecture was to be provided by the Robotics and Intelligence for Human Spaceflight lab at NASA and implemented at NASA facilities. The Gateway could have conceivably also supported in-situ resource utilization (ISRU) development and testing from lunar and asteroid sources, and would have offered the opportunity for a gradual buildup of capabilities for more complex missions over time.

Animation of Lunar Gateway's proposed orbit

Around the Earth

Viewed from the Earth

Side view – Earth is left direction.

Lunar Gateway · Earth · Moon

== Modules ==
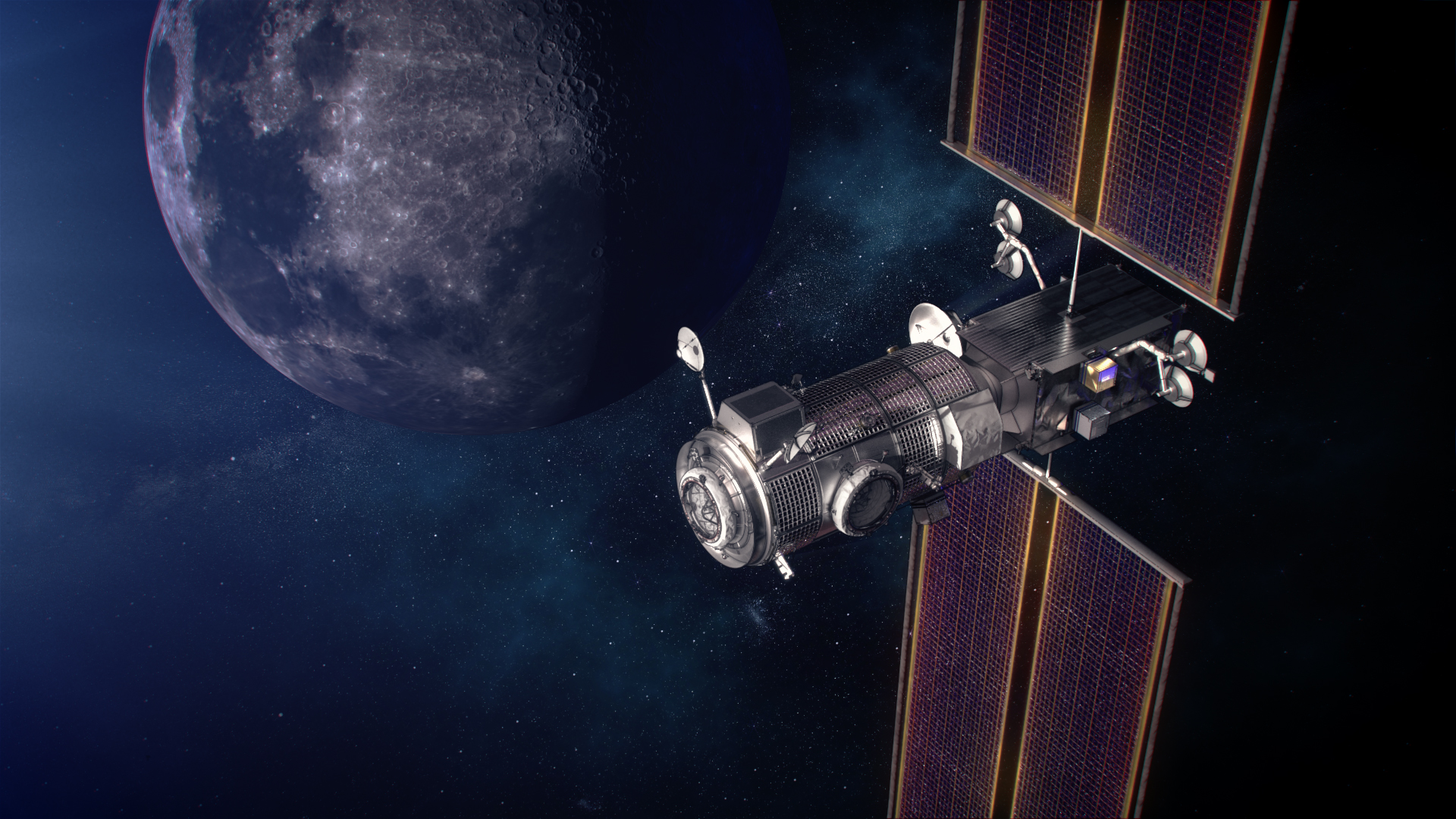
An illustration of the initial configuration of Gateway with the Power and Propulsion Element (PPE) and Habitation and Logistics Outpost (HALO) in orbit around the Moon

Solar Array	PPE propulsion module	Solar Array
Canadarm3 robotic arm	ESPRIT Lunar Link telecommunications
HLS spacecraft docking port	HALO logistics and habitat	ESPRIT Lunar View observation port and cargo storage	Cargo spacecraft docking port
Fuel storage
Utility docking port	I-HAB logistics and habitat	Crew and Science; Airlock Module
Heat radiator	Heat radiator
Orion spacecraft docking port

- The Power and Propulsion Element (PPE) was a solar electric propulsion module derived from technology developed at the Jet Propulsion Laboratory for the canceled Asteroid Redirect Mission. It was intended to provide solar electric power and ion thruster propulsion, enabling station-keeping and acting as a space tug for visiting craft. In 2019, Maxar Technologies was selected to build the PPE, based on its 1300-series satellite bus. The module was planned to launch with HALO on a Falcon Heavy. They were to be assembled together on Earth and reach lunar orbit after nine to ten months.
- The Habitation and Logistics Outpost (HALO) was a pressurized module providing living and working space supporting a crew of four for at least 30 days, along with command and control functions, and docking ports for visiting spacecraft. In 2020, Northrop Grumman was selected to build the HALO, based on its Cygnus cargo spacecraft. It was to launch together with the PPE.
- The European System Providing Refueling, Infrastructure and Telecommunications (ESPRIT) was a service module to developed by the ESA and built by Thales Alenia Space. It would have provided communications, fuel storage, and additional infrastructure. ESPRIT consists of two elements: Lunar Link, a communications package planned to launch attached to HALO, and Lunar View, a refueling and logistics element planned to launch on an SLS rocket as a co-manifested payload with the Artemis V crewed Orion spacecraft.
- I-HAB was an additional pressurized habitation module developed by ESA in collaboration with JAXA. It was intended to expand crew living and working space and was planned to launch on an SLS rocket as a co-manifested payload with the Artemis IV crewed Orion spacecraft. Like all other future modules, it would have been joined in space using the International Docking System Standard.
- Canadarm3 was a robotic manipulator system developed by the CSA, consisting of a large arm and a smaller dexterous arm. It was designed for autonomous and remotely operated use to support maintenance, assembly, and visiting vehicle operations.
- The Crew and Science Airlock Module was intended to support extravehicular activities and the deployment of external payloads. It was being developed by the MBRSC and was planned to launch on an SLS rocket as a co-manifested payload with the Artemis VI crewed Orion spacecraft.

== Criticism ==
NASA officials promoted the Gateway as a "reusable command module" that could direct activities on the lunar surface. However, Gateway has received some negative reactions.

=== Former NASA-affiliated people ===
Michael D. Griffin, a former NASA administrator, said that the Gateway could be useful only after there are facilities on the Moon producing propellant that could be transported to the Gateway. Griffin thinks that after that is achieved, the Gateway would then serve as a fuel depot. In a written testimony to Congress, Griffin stated that the current architecture requiring staging operations at a Gateway based in a lunar polar near-rectilinear halo orbit (NRHO) with a 6.5-day period was disadvantageous in that immediate return to the Gateway from the lunar surface is possible only on 6.5-day centers and that no early human lunar mission should knowingly accept the risk of stranding a crew, whether on the surface or in lunar orbit, for days at a time.

Former NASA Associate Administrator Doug Cooke wrote in an article on The Hill stating, "NASA can significantly increase speed, simplicity, cost and probability of mission success by deferring Gateway, leveraging SLS, and reducing critical mission operations". He also wrote, "NASA should launch the lander elements (ascent and descent/transfer) on an SLS Block 1B. If an independent transfer element is required, it can be launched on a commercial launcher".

George Abbey, a former director of NASA's Johnson Space Center, said, "The Gateway is, in essence, building a space station to orbit a natural space station, namely the Moon. [...] If we are going to return to the Moon, we should go directly there, not build a space station to orbit it".

Former NASA astronaut Terry W. Virts, who was a pilot of STS-130 aboard Space Shuttle Endeavour and commander of the ISS on Expedition 43, wrote in an op-ed on Ars Technica that the Gateway would "shackle human exploration, not enable it". He also said, "If we don't have the goal [of Gateway], we are putting the proverbial chicken before the egg by developing 'Gemini' before we know what 'Apollo' will look like. Regardless of a future destination, as someone who lived on the ISS for 200 days, I cannot envision a new technology that would be developed or validated by building another modular space station. Without a specific goal, we're unlikely to ever identify one". Virts further criticized NASA for abandoning its planned goal of separating crew from cargo, which was put in place following the Space Shuttle Columbia disaster in 2003.

Apollo 11 astronaut Buzz Aldrin stated that he is "quite opposed to the Gateway" and that "using the Gateway as a staging area for robotic or human missions to the lunar surface is absurd". Aldrin also questioned the benefit of the idea of sending "a crew to an intermediate point in space, pick up a lander there and go down". Conversely, Aldrin expressed support for Robert Zubrin's Moon Direct concept which involves lunar landers traveling from Earth orbit to the lunar surface and back.

Tom Young, a former director of NASA's Goddard Space Flight Center, stated at a hearing at the House Science committee that NASA's portfolio of human spaceflight programs may now be overloaded. "The plate is really full today... I personally think that the leadership is going to have to, number one, prioritize, but number two is probably to eliminate some of the things that are currently being done that will interrupt having any opportunity of 2024, or I would say even 2028". He said Artemis could be useful in preparations for later missions to Mars but he did not really see a required role for the Gateway in the lunar program.

=== Other people ===
Clive Neal, a University of Notre Dame geologist and advocate for the lunar exploration program, called the Gateway "a waste of money" and stated that NASA is "not fulfilling space policy by building an orbital space station around the Moon".

Mars Society founder Robert Zubrin called the Gateway "NASA's worst plan yet" in an article in the National Review. He said, "We do not need a lunar-orbiting station to go to the Moon. We do not need such a station to go to Mars. We do not need it to go to near-Earth asteroids. We do not need it to go anywhere. Nor can we accomplish anything in such a station that we cannot do in the Earth-orbiting International Space Station, except to expose human subjects to irradiation – a form of medical research for which a number of Nazi doctors were hanged". Zubrin also stated, "If the goal is to build a Moon base, it should be built on the surface of the Moon. That is where the science is, that is where the shielding material is, and that is where the resources to make propellant and other useful things are to be found".

Retired aerospace engineer Gerald Black wrote in an article on The Space Review stating that the Gateway is "useless for supporting human return to the lunar surface and a lunar base". He added that it was not planned to be used as a rocket fuel depot and that stopping at the Gateway on the way to or from the Moon would serve no useful purpose and cost propellant.

Astrophysicist Ethan Siegel wrote an article in Forbes titled "NASA's Idea For A Space Station In Lunar Orbit Takes Humanity Nowhere". Siegel stated that "Orbiting the Moon represents barely incremental progress; the only scientific 'advantages' to being in lunar orbit as opposed to low Earth orbit are twofold: 1. You're outside of the Van Allen belts. 2. You're closer to the lunar surface", reducing the time delay. His final opinion was that the Gateway is "a great way to spend a great deal of money, advancing science and humanity in no appreciable way".

Eric Berger, senior space editor at Ars Technica, stated in an article that the "Gateway introduces costs and complexity into the Artemis Program at a time when NASA is already contending with a superfluity of both" and that "NASA would gain several benefits from canceling Gateway" including a reduction in energy, or delta-v, needed to carry out lunar missions and a simplified lunar landing. Berger also stated that requiring both Orion and Starship to dock with and undock from the Gateway is needlessly complex. In addition, Berger also called for cancelling the Exploration Upper Stage and replacing it with United Launch Alliance's Centaur V upper stage to further simplify the Artemis Program.

Mark Whittington, a contributor to The Hill newspaper and an author of several space exploration studies, stated in an article that the "lunar orbit project doesn't help us get back to the Moon". Whittington also pointed out that a lunar orbiting space station was not used during the Apollo program and that a "reusable lunar lander could be refueled from a depot on the lunar surface and left in a parking orbit between missions without the need for a big, complex space station".

=== Response from NASA ===
On 10 December 2018, NASA Administrator Jim Bridenstine said at a presentation "There are people who say we need to get there, and we need to get there tomorrow", speaking of a crewed mission to the Moon, countering with "What we're doing here at NASA is following Space Policy Directive 1", speaking of the Gateway and following up with "I would argue that we got there in 1969. That race is over, and we won. The time now is to build a sustainable, reusable architecture. [...] The next time we go to the Moon, we're going to have American boots on the Moon with the American flag on their shoulders, and they're going to be standing side-by-side with our international partners who have never been to the Moon before".

Dan Hartman, the program manager for Gateway, on 30 March 2020, told Ars Technica that the benefits of using Gateway are extending the mission duration, buying down risk, providing research capability and the capability to re-use ascent modules.

When you go single, I'll say direct mission to the Moon, you're limited on the supplies, either with the Lander or with Orion. With the Gateway, with just with one logistics module, we think we can extend to about twice the mission duration, so 30 days to 60 days. Obviously, the more crew time you have in lunar orbit helps us with research in the human aspects of living in deep space. The more duration we have, certainly that'll help us buy down significant risk with the extreme environments that we're going to be subjecting our crews to. Because we've got to go figure out how to operate in deep space. Obviously we'll demonstrate new hardware and offer that sustainable flexible path for our Lunar Lander system. With the Gateway, the thinking is we'll be able to reuse the ascent modules potentially multiple times. And again, if we can get mission duration beyond the 30 days, it's going to offer us some additional environmental capabilities. We think it's a tremendous risk buy down asset, not only to explore the Moon sustainably, but to prove out some things that we need to do to get to Mars.

=== GAO 2024 Report ===
On 31 July 2024, the United States Government Accountability Office found that the Gateway ran into numerous technical problems which have yet to be addressed by NASA. One problem was related to the PPE's ability to keep the Gateway integrated stack in the right orbit and pointing in the right direction when large, heavier vehicles are docked with the Gateway. The report found that although the Gateway was meeting the performance requirements for stack controllability that NASA set for it, those requirements do not account for the mass of some visiting vehicles that plan to dock with the Gateway. The mass of the lunar lander Starship is approximately 18 times greater than the value NASA used to develop the PPE's controllability parameters. Another major problem was that the co-manifested vehicle mass or CMV of the PPE and HALO are both exceeding their mass allocations. The report stated that if NASA cannot reduce the mass, it could affect the Gateway's ability to reach the correct lunar orbit. The report also stated that late design changes to reduce their mass could result in cost growth or schedule delay. Another risk was found related to several defects on a network chip—which affects multiple Gateway components, including the HALO's flight computer and power distribution system, which could have led Gateway's flight computers to unexpectedly restart, resulting in losing control of Gateway. The proposed 15-year lifespan was also considered to be too short to properly support a crewed mission to Mars.

== See also ==
- CAPSTONE (spacecraft) – NASA satellite to test the Lunar Gateway orbit
- Commercial Resupply Services – NASA program for delivery of cargo to the ISS
- Exploration Gateway Platform – Original station design concept of the Lunar Gateway
- Moonbase – Long-term human settlement on the Moon
- Lunar cycler – Type of orbit which passes close to the Earth and Moon
- Orbital Piloted Assembly and Experiment Complex – Proposed Russian space station
- Project Prometheus – NASA nuclear electric propulsion project 2003–2006
- Mars Base Camp – Concept Mars orbiter
- Mars Piloted Orbital Station – Russian concept for an orbital human mission to Mars
- Starship HLS – Lunar lander variant of SpaceX Starship
- International Lunar Research Station – Planned international lunar base
