= Near-rectilinear halo orbit =

Periodic, three-dimensional orbit

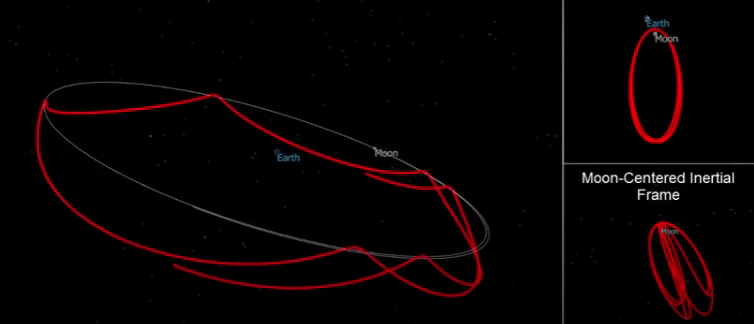
Near-rectilinear halo orbit (NRHO) in cislunar space.

In orbital mechanics a near-rectilinear halo orbit (NRHO) is a halo orbit that passes close to the smaller of two bodies and has nearly stable behavior. The CAPSTONE mission, launched in 2022, is the first spacecraft to use such orbit in cislunar space, and this Moon-centric orbit is planned as a staging area for future lunar missions. In contrast with low lunar orbit which NASA characterizes as being deep in the lunar gravity well, NRHO is described as being "balanced on the edge" of the gravity well.

The NRHOs are a subset of the L_{1} and L_{2} halo families. This orbit type could also be used with other bodies in the Solar System and beyond.

== Description ==
Near-rectilinear halo orbits are one theoretical solution to the classic three-body problem in gravitational mechanics, and have been mathematically described for decades.

Earth-Moon Lagrangian points: a spacecraft in an NRHO around the L2 Lagrange point would have a view of Earth unobstructed by the Moon.

A halo orbit is a periodic, three-dimensional orbit associated with one of the L_{1}, L_{2} and L_{3} Lagrange points. Within each halo family, the orbits grow out of the plane of the two primary bodies until they are nearly polar. The near-rectilinear halo orbits are the members at this end of the family, which make the closest approach to the smaller body. The name describes their shape: followed toward the nearer primary, a halo family narrows into orbits that are close to a straight line and stand roughly perpendicular to the plane in which the primaries move.

There are four families of NRHO orbits associated with the L_{1} and L_{2} points, two each in the northern and southern directions. The low perilune orbits are nearly polar. They are nearly stable, minimizing the artificial thrust required for station-keeping.

== NRHO in spaceflight ==
By 2018, NASA began considering a near-rectilinear halo orbit for a future lunar mission, and by 2020 an Earth-Moon L_{2} NRHO had become the planned orbit for the now-cancelled NASA Lunar Gateway. The Gateway orbit would have been a 9:2 resonant NRHO, with a period of about 7 days and a high orbital eccentricity, bringing the station within 3,000 kilometers (1,900 mi) of the lunar north pole at closest approach and as far away as 70,000 kilometers (43,000 mi) over the lunar south pole.

NASA's 2020 plans for a crewed Artemis III mission to the lunar surface without the proposed Lunar Gateway but retaining the planned use of a NRHO for orbital rendezvous between the Orion spacecraft and a lunar lander have themselves been replaced.

As of 2026, Artemis IV is expected to be the first crewed moon landing since 1972, and may rely on the same NRHO.

Animations of the Lunar Gateway NRHO

View outside the Earth-Moon system

View from the Earth

Side view of orbit - Earth is left

Lunar Gateway · Earth · Moon

=== NRHO flown missions ===
By 2022, the company Advanced Space built a 12-unit cubesat to fly on a Gateway precursor mission for NASA. Named CAPSTONE (Cislunar Autonomous Positioning System Technology Operations and Navigation Experiment), the spacecraft became the first spacecraft to operate in an NRHO lunar orbit from 14 November 2022 after launch on 28 June 2022. The mission objective was to test and verify the calculated orbital stability planned later for the NASA Lunar Gateway space station, and the spacecraft will fly the identical orbital parameters planned later for Gateway. It will also test a navigation system that will measure spacecraft position relative to NASA's Lunar Reconnaissance Orbiter (LRO), without relying on ground stations. A followup mission - CAPSTONE 2 - to test rendezvous and formation flying techniques with two probes is scheduled to launch in 2027.

NASA/JPL's Lunar Flashlight, a cubesat intended to search for water near the lunar south pole, was also planned to use a near-rectilinear halo orbit, but the satellite failed to reach the NRHO following thruster underperformances after launch in 2022.
