= Artemis IV =

Planned spaceflight mission

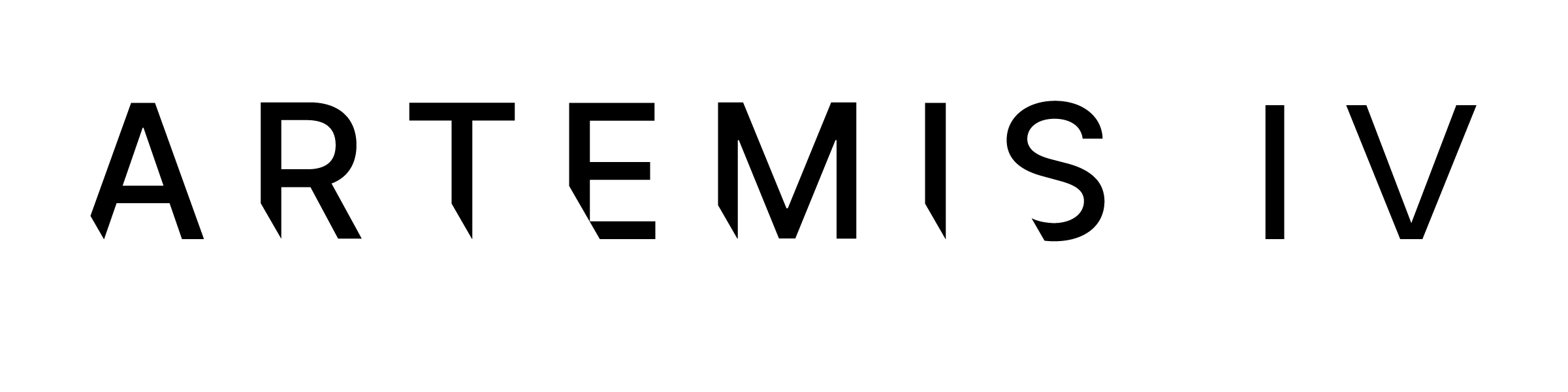
- Mission type: Crewed Lunar landing
- Operator: NASA
- Website: nasa.gov/mission/artemis-iv

Spacecraft properties
- Spacecraft: Orion CM-005; ESM-4; Blue Moon or Starship HLS
- Manufacturer: Orion CM: Lockheed Martin; ESM: Airbus Defence and Space; Blue Moon: Blue Origin; Starship: SpaceX

Start of mission
- Launch date: Early 2028 (planned)
- Rocket: Space Launch System
- Launch site: Kennedy, LC-39B

End of mission
- Landing site: Pacific Ocean (planned)

Artemis IV is planned to be the third crewed mission and the first Moon landing in the NASA-led Artemis lunar exploration program, marking the first crewed Moon landing since Apollo 17 in 1972. The mission is planned for early 2028.

The landing will use either SpaceX's Starship HLS or Blue Origin's Blue Moon. The lander will be launched first. Once it is ready, a Space Launch System (SLS) rocket will launch an Orion spacecraft carrying the four astronaut crew members. With Starship, both vehicles are planned to dock in low Earth orbit and Starship will push both to a lunar orbit. With Blue Moon, SLS launches Orion towards the Moon to dock in a lunar orbit. With either option, two astronauts will transfer to the lander, descend to the lunar surface and conduct extravehicular activities there. They will then ascend back to the Orion waiting in lunar orbit, which will return the four astronauts to Earth. As of March 2026, NASA is targeting early 2028 for launch.

As an alternative plan, the spacecraft could meet in an elliptical polar orbit with coplanar lines of apsides and dock. This orbit has a perilune of 100 kilometers (62 mi; 54 nmi), minimizing the number and duration of burns the HLS must perform to reach the lunar surface, and an apolune of 6,500 kilometers (4,000 mi; 3,500 nmi) to accommodate the limited propulsion of Orion's European Service Module, which cannot depart from a low lunar orbit.

== History ==
Before October 2022, the goal for Artemis IV was to deliver the I-HAB module to the Lunar Gateway. Between October 2022 and February 2026, it was set to be the second lunar landing of the Artemis program, after the planned Artemis III. In February 2026, this mission became the first planned lunar landing of the program, with a planned launch date of early 2028, and the Lunar Gateway was cancelled in March 2026.

== Elements ==
=== Space Launch System ===
Michoud Assembly Facility workers transport the SLS core stage hydrogen tank for cleaning, July 2026

The Space Launch System (SLS) is a super-heavy-lift launcher used to launch the Orion spacecraft from Earth to a trans-lunar orbit. This mission's core stage will use RS-25 engines E2044, E2050, E2051, and E2063. This will be the final mission to launch with an Interim Cryogenic Propulsion Stage (ICPS).

=== Orion Multi-Purpose Crew Vehicle ===
The Orion crew module pressure vessel at the Kennedy Space Center in February 2023

Orion is the crew transport vehicle used by all Artemis missions. It comprises the Orion Crew Module and the European Service Module and will transport the crew from Earth to Lunar orbit, dock to the lander, and return them to Earth.

The European Service Module (ESM) for Artemis IV, ESM-4, was delivered to NASA from the Airbus facility in Bremen, Germany, in December 2025.

=== Human Landing System ===
October 2026 concept of operations graphic released by NASA, illustrating the Blue Moon lander and a number of transfer stages

The concept of operations for the Starship HLS lander, illustrating its use as a trans-lunar injection stage

Artemis IV will use one of NASA's two Human Landing System lunar landers: SpaceX's Starship HLS or Blue Origin's Blue Moon. The choice of lander depends on the results of the low-Earth orbit rendezvous and docking tests conducted during Artemis III in mid-2027, as well as each company's readiness to deliver the spacecraft for the mission.

== See also ==
- List of Artemis missions
- List of missions to the Moon
- Apollo 11, the first lunar landing of the Apollo program
- New Space Race
