= Deep Space Habitat =

Conceptual design for Mars-bound spaceship

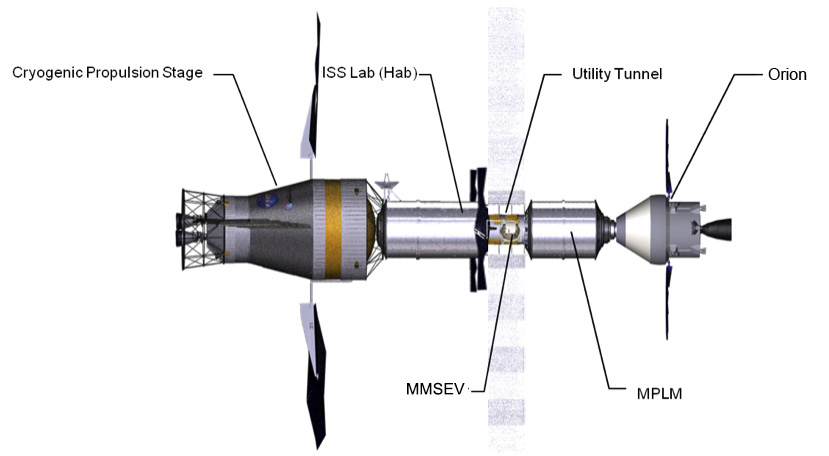
500 day HAB/MPLM with a cryogenic propulsion stage

The Deep Space Habitat (DSH) is a series of concepts explored between 2012 and 2018 by NASA for methods to support crewed exploration missions to the Moon, asteroids, and eventually Mars. Some of these concepts were eventually used in the Lunar Gateway program.

== Overview ==
Since 2012, numerous iterations of large lunar and Mars transport habitats have been conceived in previous studies to be launched with the Space Launch System (SLS), and are intended to also be compatible with the Orion capsule. Variations of the designs would be used for the Lunar Gateway and the Deep Space Transport.

Early preliminary concepts considered 60-day and 500-day mission configurations, composed of International Space Station-derived hardware, the Orion crew capsule and various support craft. The habitat would be equipped with at least one International Docking System Standard (IDSS) docking system. Developing a deep space habitat would allow a crew to live and work safely in space for about one year on missions to explore cislunar space, Mars, and some near-Earth asteroids.

In 2015, NASA funded studies for several types of deep space habitat concepts under the Next Space Technologies for Exploration Partnerships (NextSTEP). Lockheed Martin, the main contractor of the Orion capsule, also produced in 2018 a Deep Space Habitat concept. These concept studies were intended to help NASA decide on a final design for the habitat element for the Lunar Gateway.

== Configurations ==
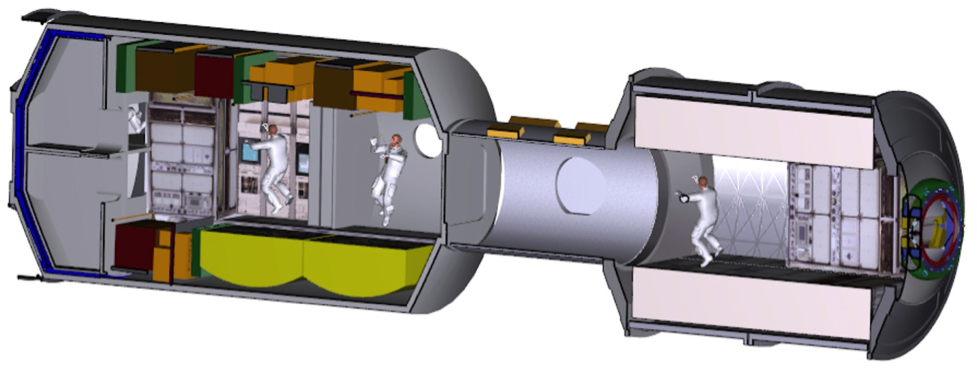
ISS-derived Deep Space Habitat HAB/MPLM

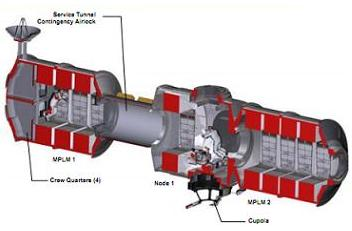
ISS-derived Deep Space Habitat MPLM/Node1

=== HAB/MPLM ===
MPLM stands for Multi-Purpose Logistics Module

- 60 Day Mission – The basic 60-day mission variant would consist of a Cryogenic Propulsion Stage (CPS), ISS Destiny-derived lab module, and an airlock/tunnel. In addition, a mission-specific support craft, such as the FlexCraft or the Multi-Mission Space Exploration Vehicle (MMSEV) would be docked to the airlock/tunnel. The Destiny-derived lab houses both the crew quarters and the ECLSS components
- 500 Day Mission – The 500 Day mission variant would consist of the same 60-day crew habitat and crew size. Mass increases would result from the addition of a Multi-Purpose Logistics Module (MPLM) to provide additional supply storage for the extended mission duration. It would be 8 m (26 ft) long and 4.5 m (15 ft) in diameter.

=== MPLM/Node 1 ===
- 60 Day Mission – The basic vehicle elements for this configuration would include a CPS, a MPLM, Utility tunnel/airlock, Node 4 Structural Test Article. The Node element would allow for the attachment of more than one FlexCraft or Space Exploration Vehicle (MMSEV). The Habitat would be crew serviceable at the front of the Node element opposite the tunnel.
- 500 Day Mission – This 500-day mission variant would have a second MPLM attached to the front on the vehicle as well as add a Cupola to the Node section.

== Suggested support craft ==
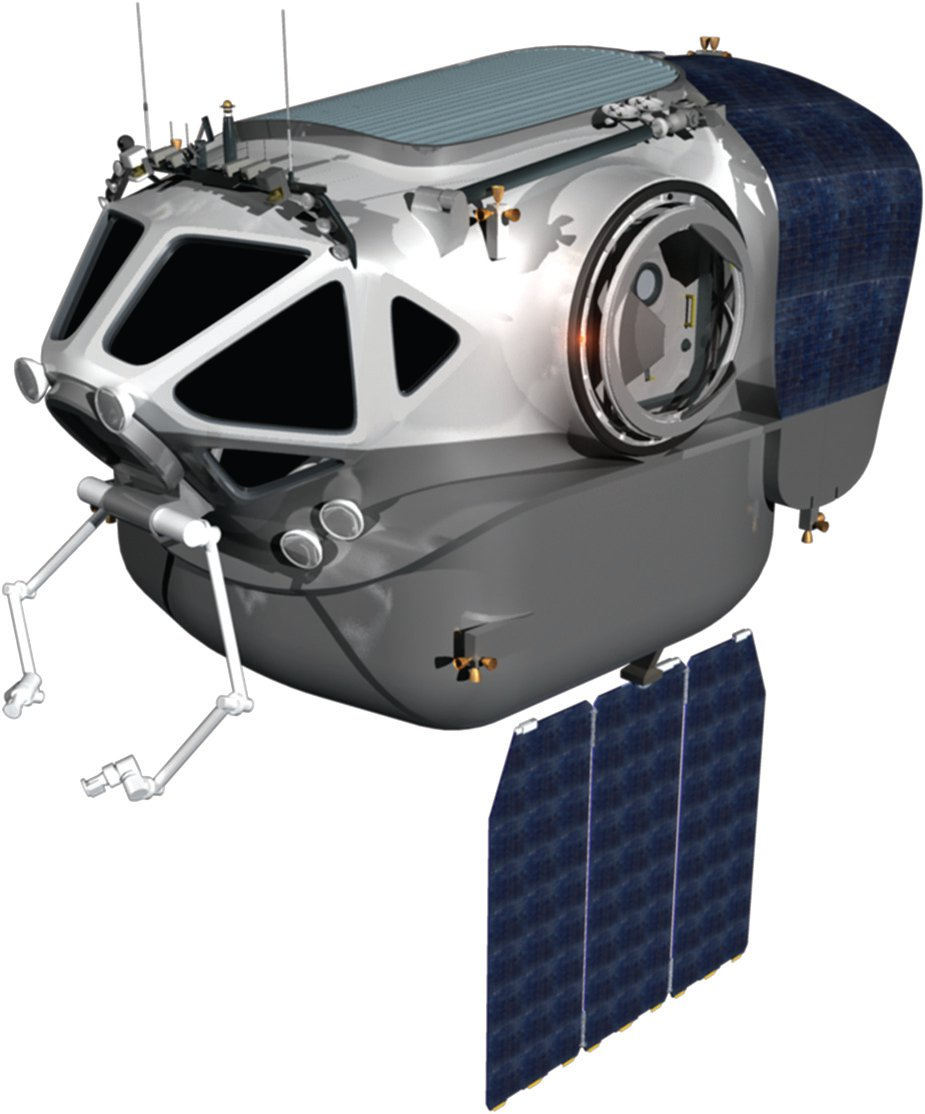
MMSEV servicing craft

- Orion, is being developed by NASA, Lockheed Martin, and Airbus Defence and Space for crewed deep space travel. It is capable of carrying 4 crew, and able to withstand re-entry speeds from lunar or Martian trajectories.
- MMSEV – a NASA-designed servicing craft. Capable of supporting a crew of two for up to 2 weeks and having suitports for extravehicular activity (EVA).
- DSH FlexCraft – a single crew vehicle, attached to the DSH similar to a visiting craft to the International Space Station. FlexCraft would be used by an individual astronaut for EVA or tele-operated activities. The hardware would connect directly to the DSH airlock and would share a common atmosphere as the parent ship to provide immediate access to space without pre-breathing by DSH crew. With a pressurized volume of 0.62 m^{3}, the FlexCraft is meant for only one person with an "excursion time" of less than 8 hours. Its propellant would be gaseous nitrogen, and it would have a Delta-V of 21 m/s (69 ft/s) with a total gross mass projected at 452 kg (996 lb). An already-identified limitation is that it cannot be used during solar particle events. The FlexCraft concept was first presented in a 2012 conference paper by Brand N. Griffin.

== See also ==
- Deep Space Transport
- Exploration Gateway Platform
- Nautilus-X
