= Mars Base Camp =

Concept Mars orbiter

- Mission type: Crewed Mars laboratory orbiter/interplanetary spacecraft

Spacecraft properties
- Spacecraft type: Interplanetary

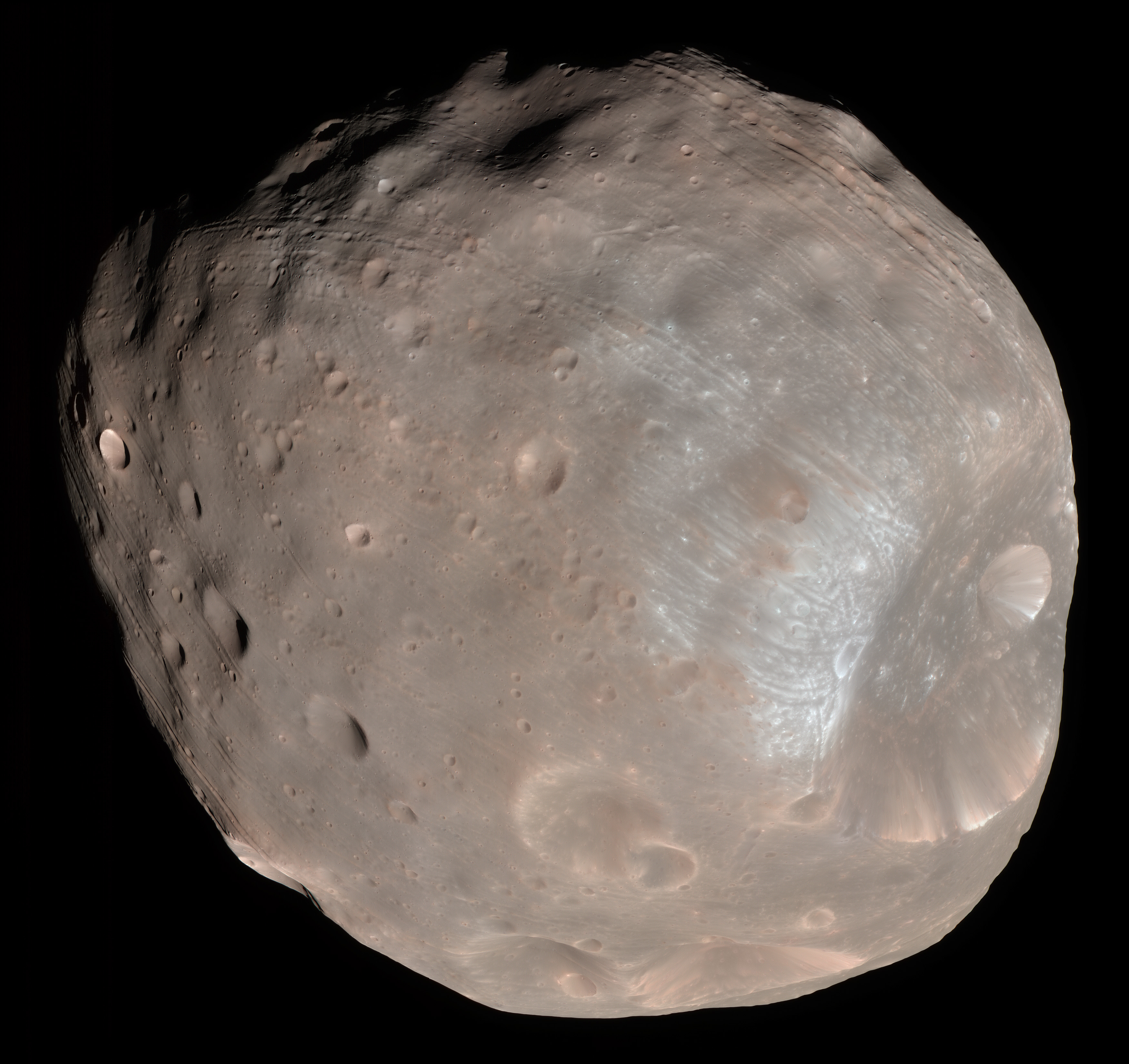
The Martian moon Phobos was suggested as a science and exploration target

Mars Base Camp (MBC) is a crewed Mars laboratory orbiter concept under study commissioned by NASA from Lockheed Martin in the US. It would use both future and proven concepts as well as the Orion MPCV, also built by Lockheed Martin.

The Mars Base Camp concept has been proposed to NASA as a possible version of the Deep Space Transport, a crewed interplanetary spacecraft to support science exploration missions to Mars of up to 1,000 days. It would be part of a larger architecture that includes the Lunar Gateway space station. As of April 2018, the Mars transit vehicle is still a concept to be studied, and NASA has not officially proposed the mission in an annual U.S. federal government budget cycle.

The purpose of MBC would be to conduct real-time communication science, both in Mars orbit and on the surface of its moons (Deimos and Phobos), and serve as a proving ground in preparing humans for future missions to Mars’s surface.

== History ==
The concept was published in May 2016 by Lockheed Martin, and it is a design for a spacecraft for carrying humans to Mars orbit and conducting operations in Mars orbit. Mars Base Camp harnesses many NASA technologies in development, or technology goals at the time of the 2010s.

In September 2017, the plan was updated including a concept for a reusable crewed shuttle called MADV (Mars Ascent Descent Vehicle), which would connect to the MBC Mars space station.

== Hardware ==
Mars Base Camp lays out a proposed technology road map to support NASA's Moon to Mars through the Deep Space Transport and the Lunar Gateway. The main systems and modules are:

- Orion MPCV – Command-and-control heart of the orbiting spacecraft, housing vital navigation, communications and life support for extended missions.
- Solar arrays – Generate the power for spacecraft operations and solar electric propulsion engines.
- Radiators – Regulate heat of electronics and crew habitation quarters.
- Cryogenic propulsion stage – Provide thrust for injection trajectory burns from the Moon heading to Mars. In addition, the propulsion stage will have the capability to provide maneuverability via impulse burn thrusters for excursions to Deimos and Phobos. During these missions, the Cryogenic Propulsion Stage will transport Orion, a Service Module, and Excursion Module for the purpose of delivering scientist-astronauts to the satellite surfaces.
- Laboratory – Houses scientific equipment, sample analysis tools and workstations to remotely pilot drones and rovers on the Martian surface.
- Habitat – Provides additional living quarters for crew, as well as consumables storage, radiation protection, and exercise equipment.
- Mars Ascent/Descent Vehicle (MADV) would be the Excursion Module, designed to house one or multiple excursion vehicles to be utilized by crews performing scientific work on the surface of the Martian moons. A prototype has been suggested to first operate on the Moon: the Lockheed Martin Lunar Lander.

== See also ==
- Mars orbit rendezvous
