= Crewed Mars rover =

Mars rovers transporting people

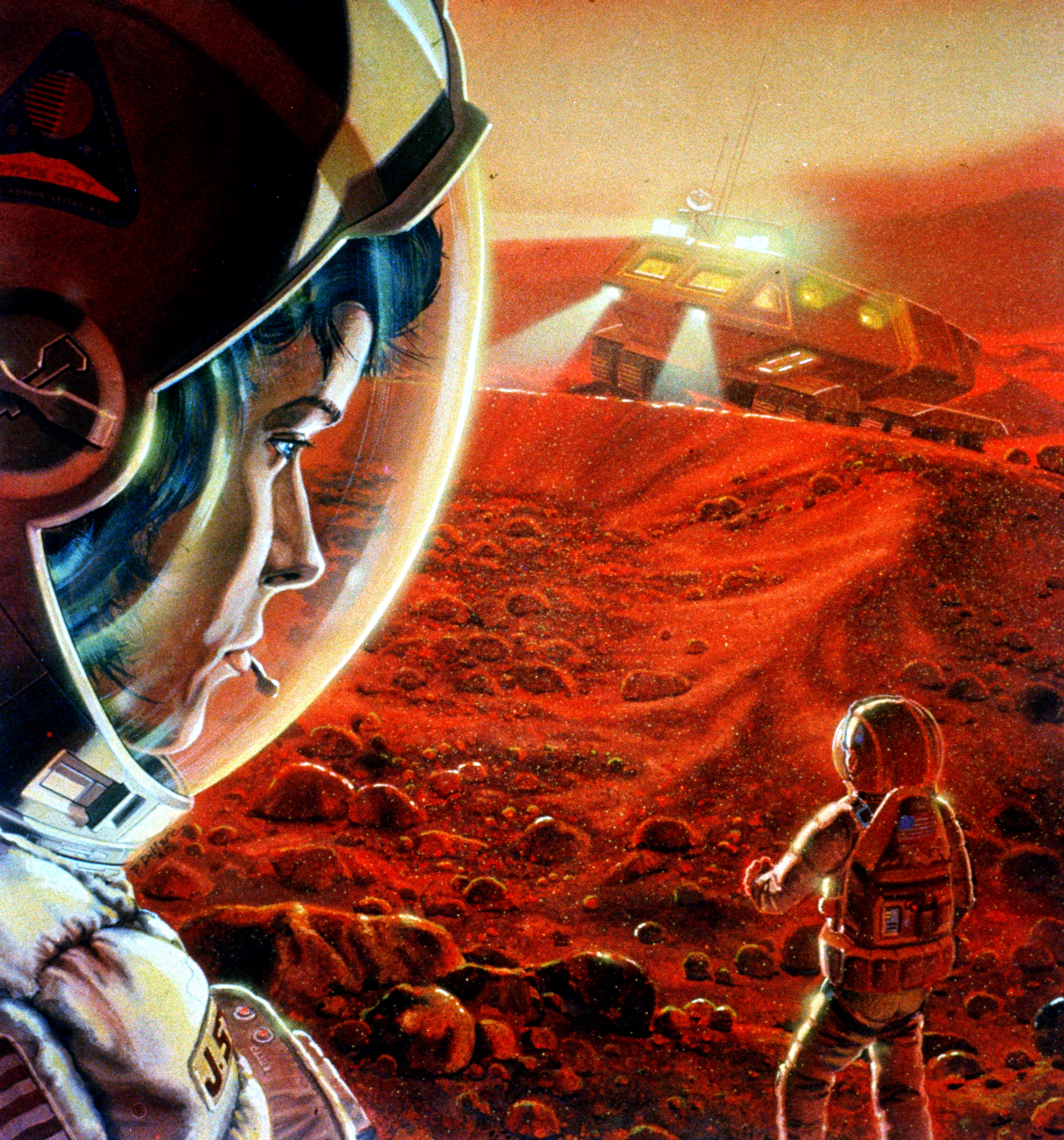
This space art, titled The Next Stop was selected by the ESA when discussing its Aurora programme.

Crewed Mars rovers (also called manned Mars rovers) are Mars rovers for transporting people on the planet Mars, and have been conceptualized as part of human missions to that planet.

Two types of crewed Mars rovers are unpressurized for a crew in Mars space suits, and pressurized for the crew to work without a space suit. Pressurized rovers have been envisioned for short trips from a Mars base, or may be equipped as a mobile base or laboratory.

Crewed Mars rovers are a component of many designs for a human mission to the planet Mars. For example, the Austere Human Missions to Mars proposal included two rovers on its uncrewed power and logistics cargo lander. Each rover could hold a crew of two in a pressurized environment, with power coming from a Stirling radioisotope generator.

== Examples ==
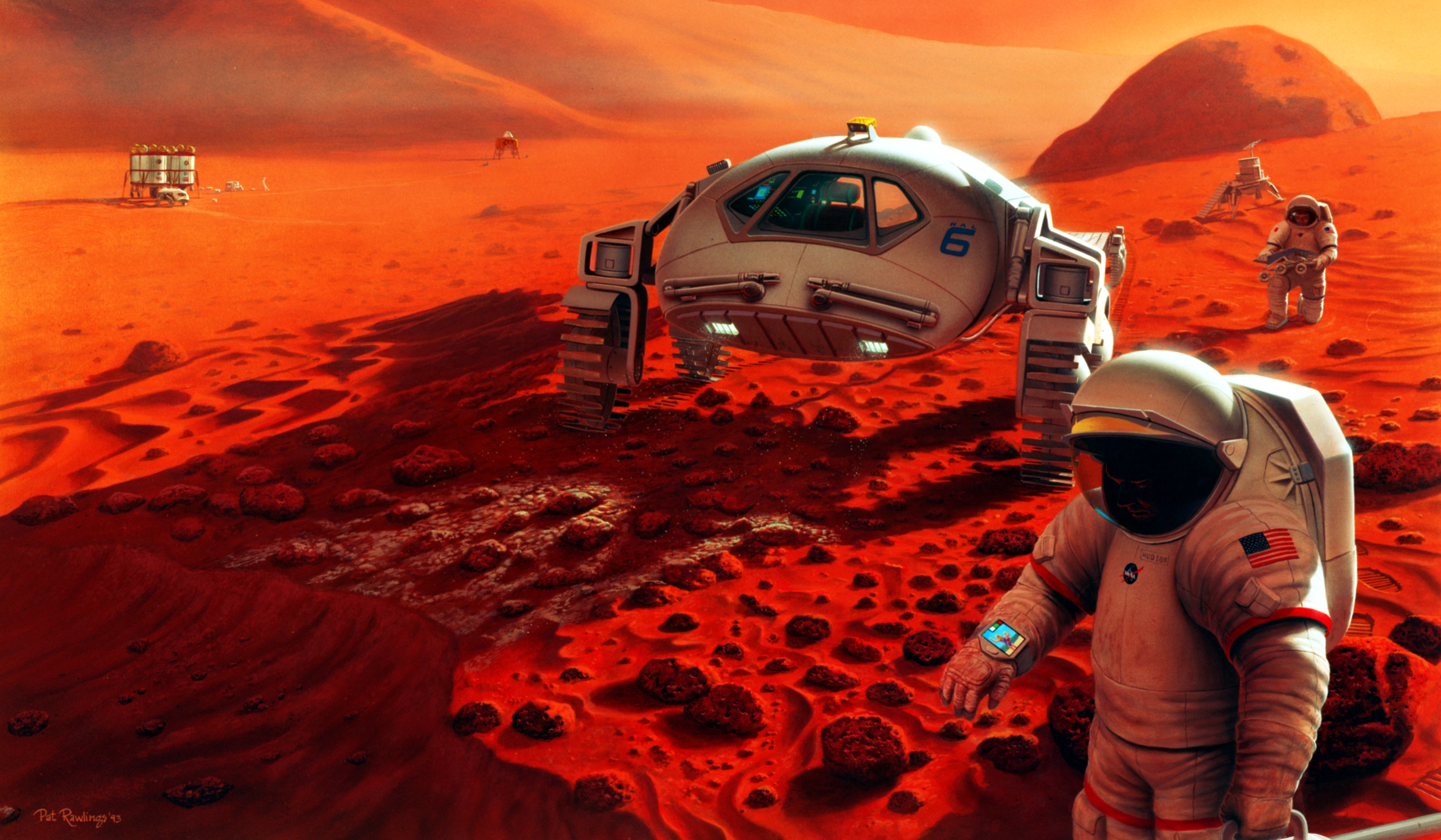
Mars rover with person in a Mars suit (NASA, 1995)

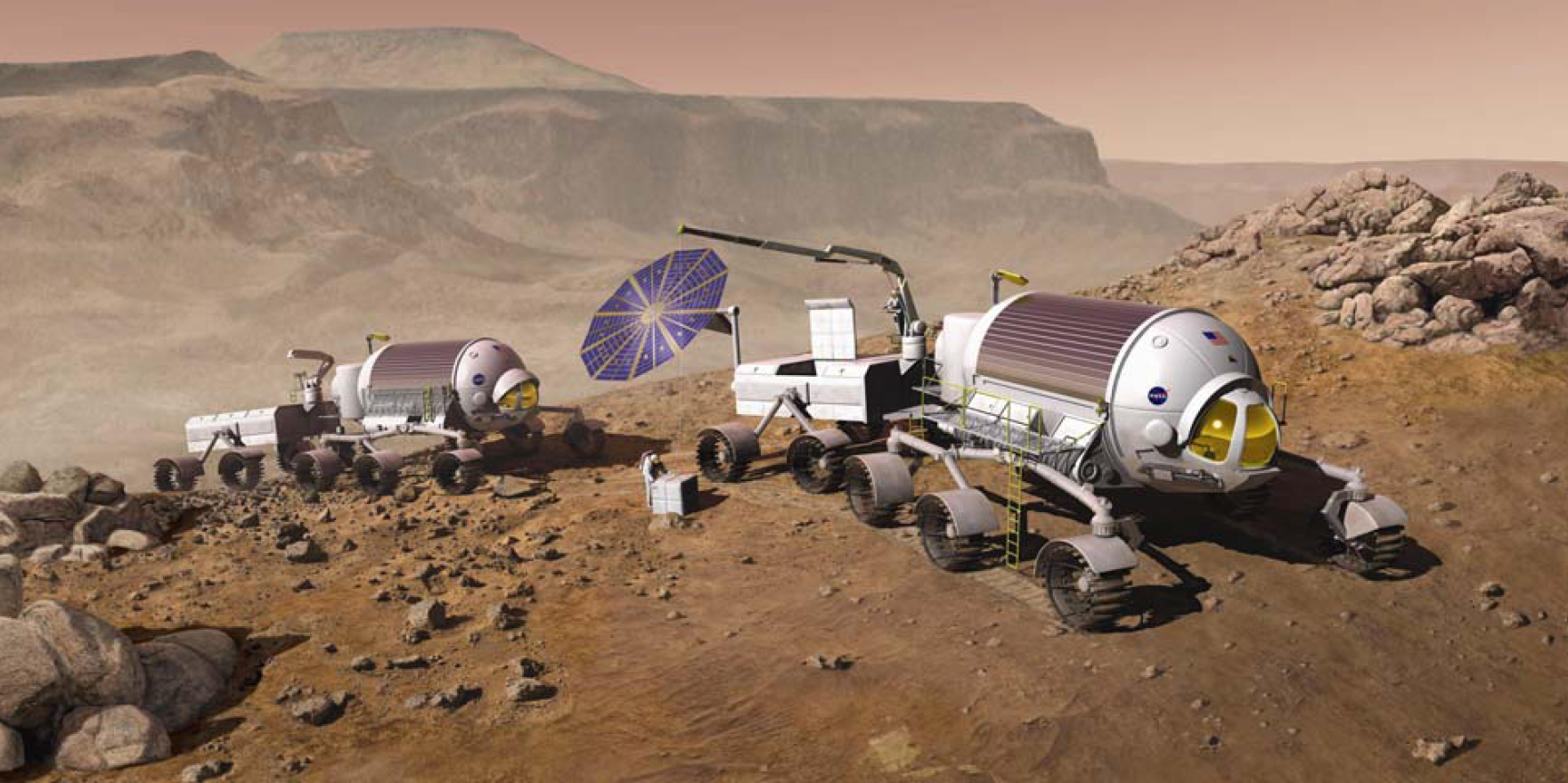
Pressurized rovers for a human expedition to planet Mars

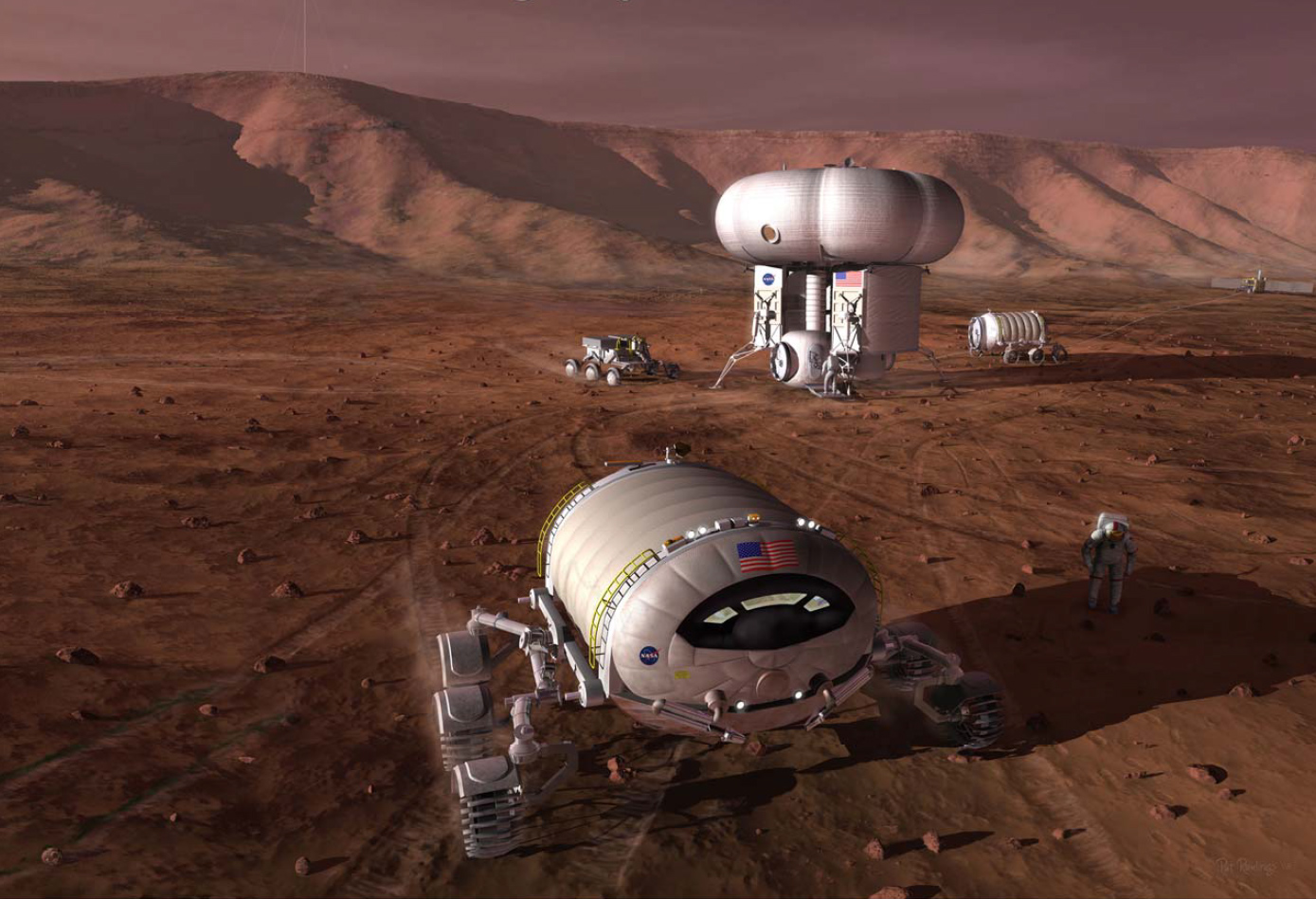
DRMA 5.0 "commuter" Mars base, featuring a pressurized rover for two, with a 5 kilowatt Stirling radioisotope generator for power.

In the 1960s, the post-Mariner 4 design for a Mars Excursion Module, by Marshall Space Flight Center, including a cargo version carrying a pressurized Mobile Laboratory for Mars, called MOLAB. One of the ideas for Molab was for it to touch down on its wheels, what was called a "rover first" concept. MOLAB had a pressurized cylinder for crews to operate in a shirt-sleeve environment even on an extraterrestrial surface.

Mars One, a Mars colonization plan intended to be funded by a TV show, planned an unpressurized crewed rover capable of traveling 80 km (50 miles). Astrobotic Technology was announced as a possible supplier.

The Manned Mars Exploration Rover (MMER) won a design award in 2010. Some features included live-aboard capability, a winch, airlock, and six foam core wheels. It featured modular construction so it could be assembled from smaller parts, and the suggested power source was radioisotope batteries. An example of RTG use is the Cassini-Huygens spacecraft, with a radioisotope power system that produced several hundred watts of electrical power. It produces this amount of power continuously with a slow decline over decades, with some of the heat given off by radioactive decay going to the production of electricity and a larger amount radiated as waste.

In 2017, the Park Brother's Concepts debuted their Mars Rover design, which featured a six-wheel design, enclosed cab, and a mobile laboratory concept. The rover concept is a Non-NASA design, but did debut at the Kennedy Space Center's Summer of Mars and is back dropped by agencies goal of getting humans to Mars by the early 2030s. Car and Driver magazine reported on this event, dubbing the rover a 'Mars Car' and noting the designers and various specifications of the vehicle, such as its size.

An example of an in-house NASA design for rover is the wheeled version of the Space Exploration Vehicle, which has a version for outer space. An early version of the SEV rover was tested in 2008 by NASA in the desert. The SEV for space or roving missions was designed to support two humans for 14-days, and would include a toilet, sleeping logistics, and one version has suitports to support EVAs. Another concept is a windows that allow looking at objects very close to the front of the rover but on surface (down and to the front).

== Navigation ==
For options for keeping track of location as the rover moves around Mars include:

- Topographic cues from images
- Inertial measurements (see also Inertial measurement unit)
- A Mars GPS if emplaced
- Celestial navigation

Navigation on Mars is noted as important issue for human missions to the planet. Celestial navigation, used for over 500 years on Earth, may provide a way of locating on the Mars surface to within about 100 meters (109 yards). Navigation is especially relevant to rovers, because they need to know at least roughly where they are and where they are going to get to a destination. Dead reckoning was the method used by the Mars Pathfinder rover Sojourner for navigation.

A GPS satellite network for Mars would mean a constellation of satellites in Mars orbit, but one alternative would be a surface based pseudo-satellites array. These devices would have to be emplaced with high precision, unless they were self-calibrating.

== Rover design ==
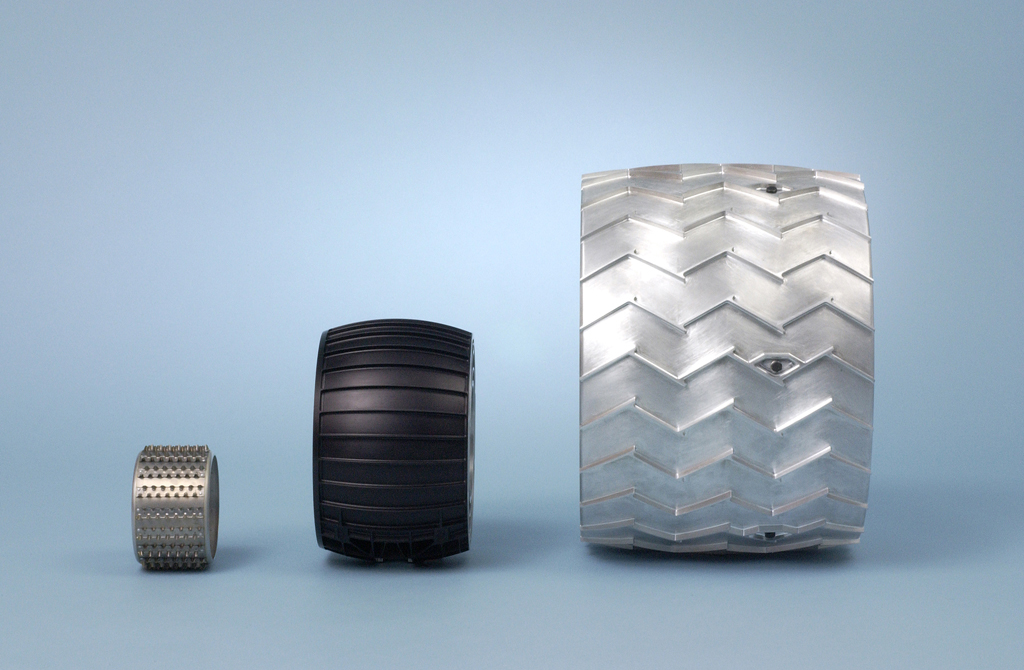
Mars rover wheels from Sojourner, the twin MERs, and Curiosity

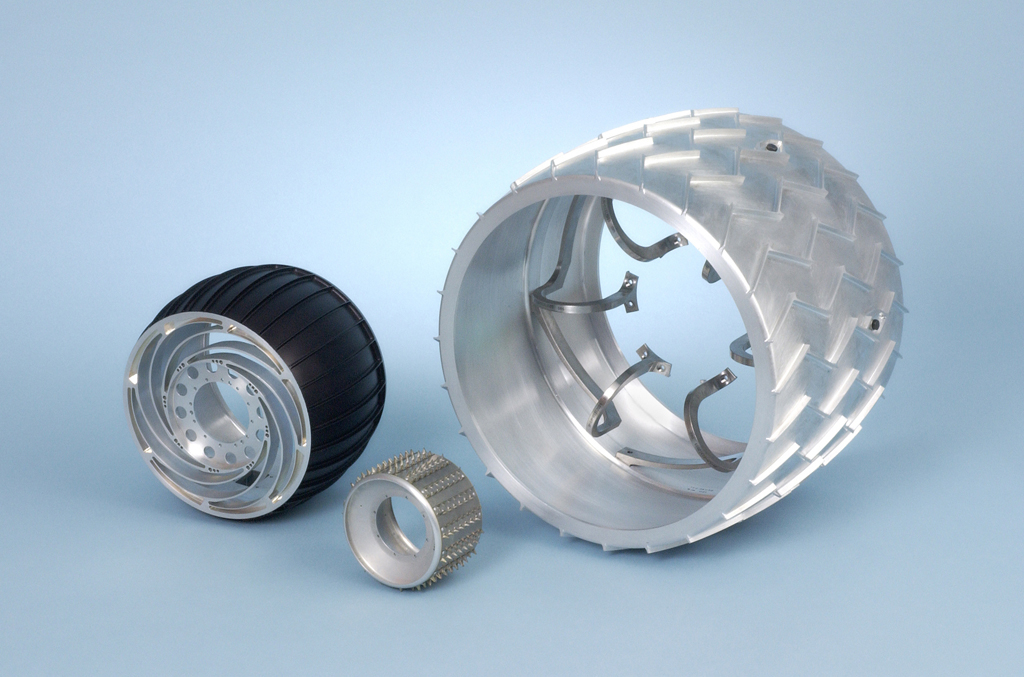
Rover wheels 3/4 view

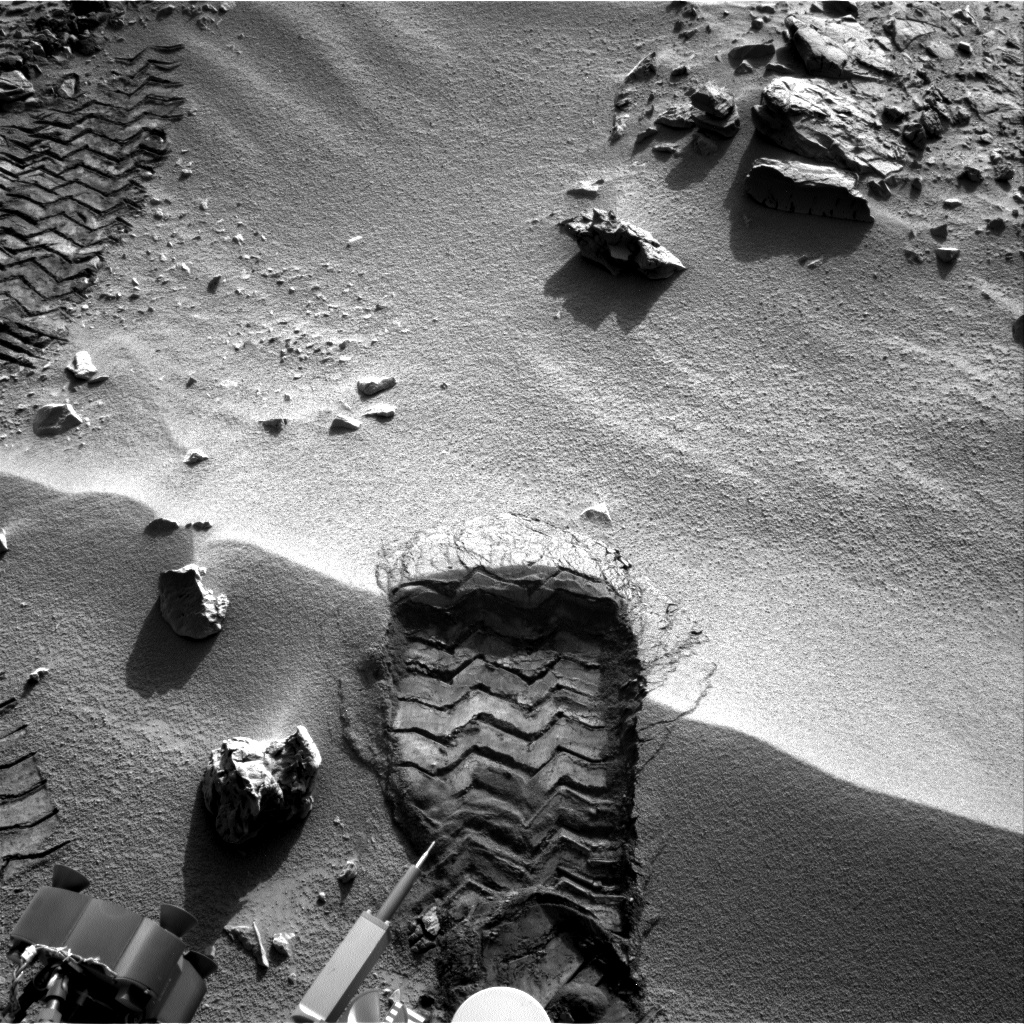
Curiosity's 'wheelprint' on Mars

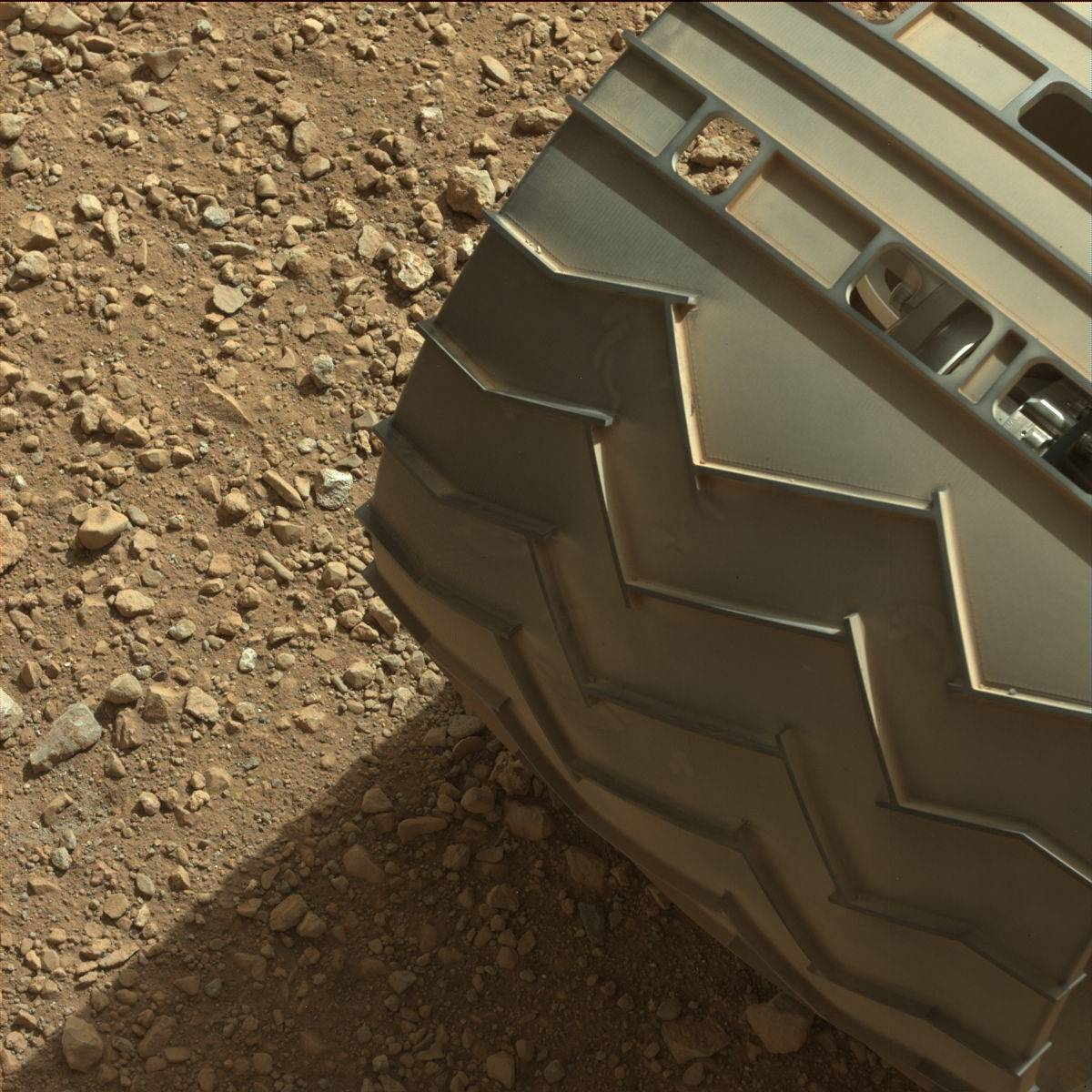
Curiosity's wheel on Mars

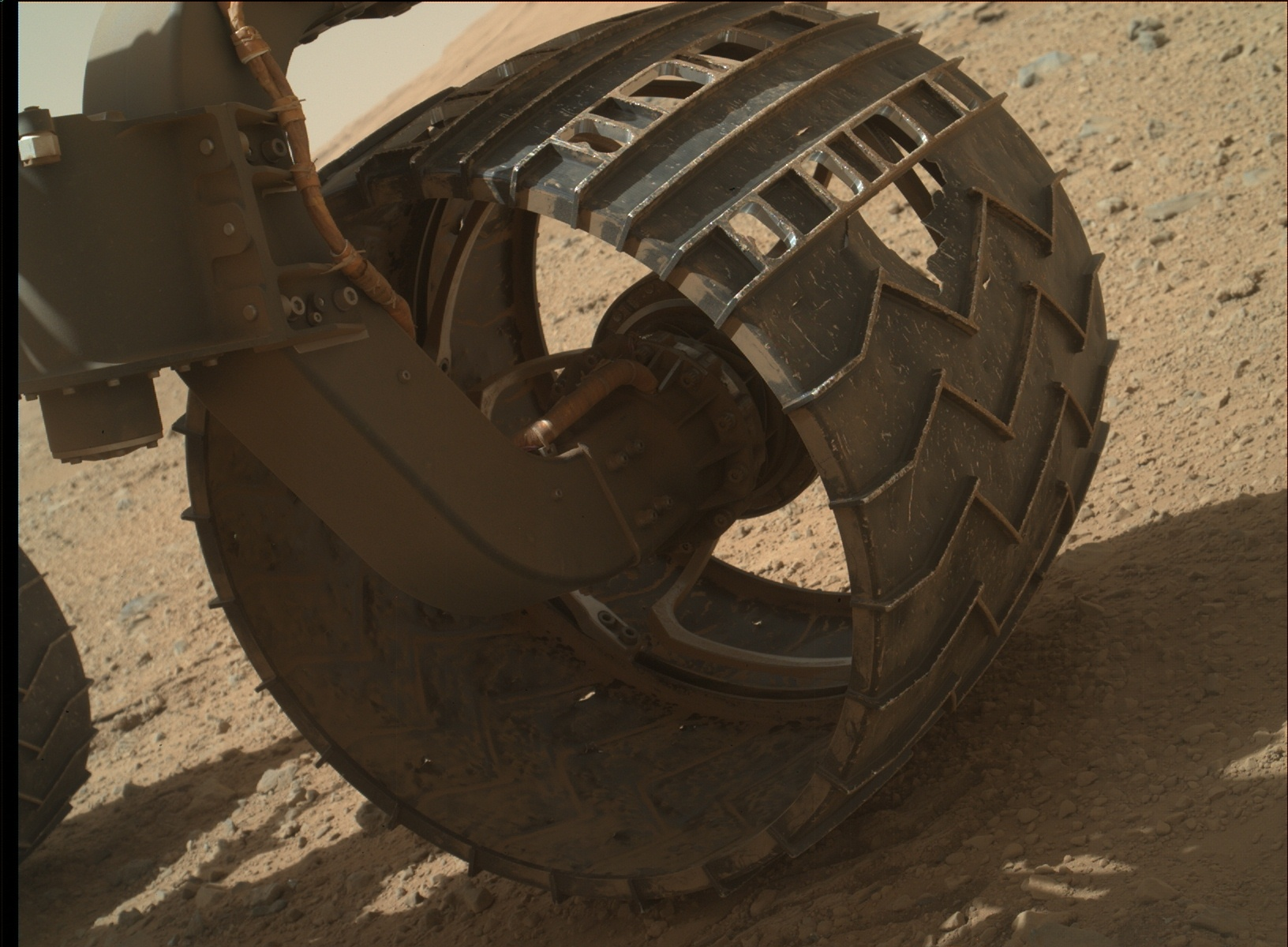
Curiosity's wheel damaged by the Martian environment.

An example of criteria for a crewed Mars surface rover was expressed by NASA in the surface variant of the aforementioned SEV, in development during the 2010s. The 1980s era "Case for Mars" design suggest a medium-range rover with two compartments, one which could be depressurized and opened up to the Mars atmosphere, and a driving compartments which could remain pressurized during this time. The same study also suggested a bigger, long-duration rover with tracks and robotic arms, in addition to other types in that crewed Mars mission concept. Airlock design, especially for EVA, is an area of study for pressurized rovers.

Design ideas for crewed and/or pressurized rovers:

- Docking hatch – a docking hatch would allow the rover to connect to a Mars surface habitat, ascent stage, or other rover, allowing the passage of people in a pressurized thru-way after docking
- Suit port – an integrated combining of the rover with a Mars suit design, allowing a person to enter a Mars suit that has an opening connected to the pressurized interior of the rover, yet the rest of suit exterior remains exposed to the Mars environment. This would avoid having a separate airlock or depressurizing the whole vehicle when opening an exterior hatch
- Modular design – this a design concept that would mean making components of the rover able to be swapped for other components in convenient way or disassembled into smaller sections. For example, a rover might able to be broken down into smaller pieces that are assembled on the surface after being landed on the surface of Mars. This would allow for larger rovers to be delivered to the surface of Mars. A modular design would also allow for different work packages, such as a crane, backhoe, or cable winch, to be swapped in as needed.
- Chariot piloting station – this is a place for a Mars-suited astronaut to control the rover without having to re-enter the pressurized area
- Ice-shield heat sink – one idea is to have a 2.5 cm barrier of ice as shielding, and this ice could also be used as a heat sink

Additional possible technologies:

- Fuel cells and/or high-energy-density batteries
- Regenerative brakes
- Wheels
- Light-weight structures and materials
- Active suspension
- Avionics and software
- Extravehicular activity (EVA) support
- Thermal control systems
- Automated rendezvous and docking

In crewed Mars missions, rovers are sometimes grouped under the term "Mars surface elements".

== Unpressurized rover ==
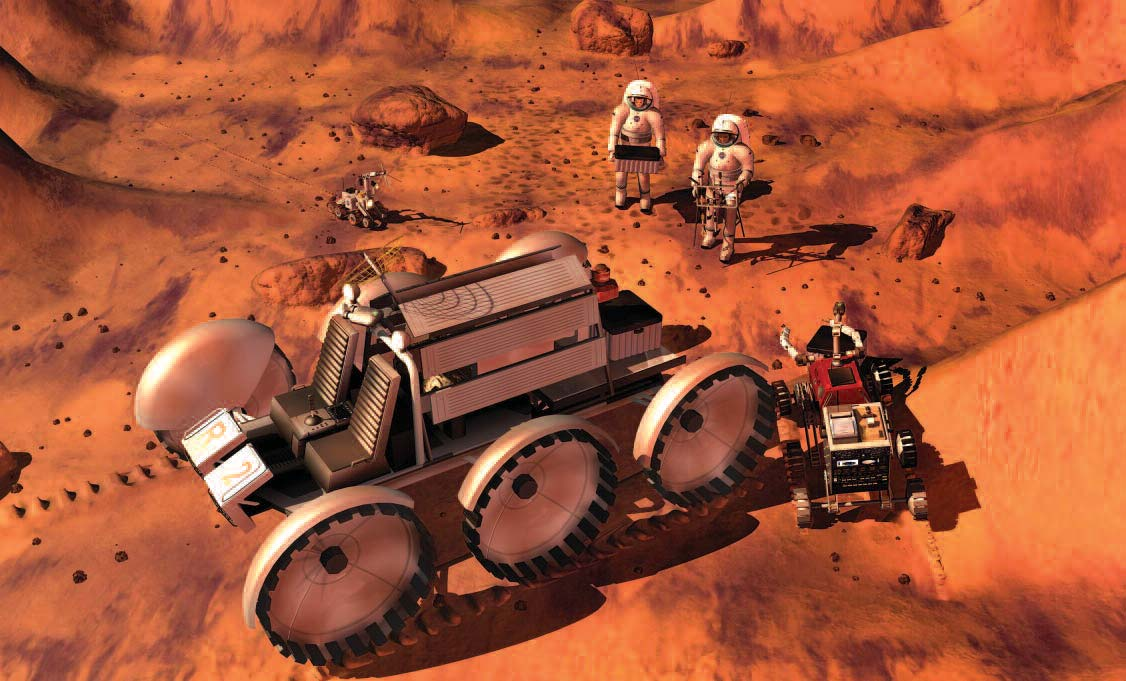
Buggy-style Mars rover for Mars suited astronauts

An unpressurized Mars rover is a Mars rover that does not contain oxygen gas, nor has a hull that contains pressurized gas. Such crewed Mars rovers would require the crew to wear spacesuits to provide oxygen for them, being functionally similar to the Lunar Roving Vehicle. There are several advantages to having an unpressurized rover as opposed to a pressurized variant, such as a reduced weight, less oxygen supply needed, easier to design, and cheaper to build and operate. A pressurized rover would weigh more, adding to fuel costs both in its launch to Mars and the greater energy usage of a larger vehicle; this would thus be more difficult and troublesome to handle compared to a lighter unpressurized rover. Unpressurized rovers could also be used to carry cargo to and from a base, and conveniently allow astronauts that are exploring the Martian terrain to be transported more easily.

== See also ==
- Electra (radio) (commonly used spacecraft radio at Mars)
- Human mission to Mars
- Johnson Sea Link (a submersible with a clear sphere for viewing)
- Lunar Roving Vehicle (the crewed rover of Apollo missions, used on the Moon during Apollo 15, Apollo 16, and Apollo 17 in the early 1970s)
- Mars habitat
- Mars rover
- Mars suit (e.g. Mars space suit)
- Rocker-bogie (suspension design used on NASA Mars rovers to-date)
- Space Exploration Vehicle
