= Mars orbit rendezvous =

Space travel concept

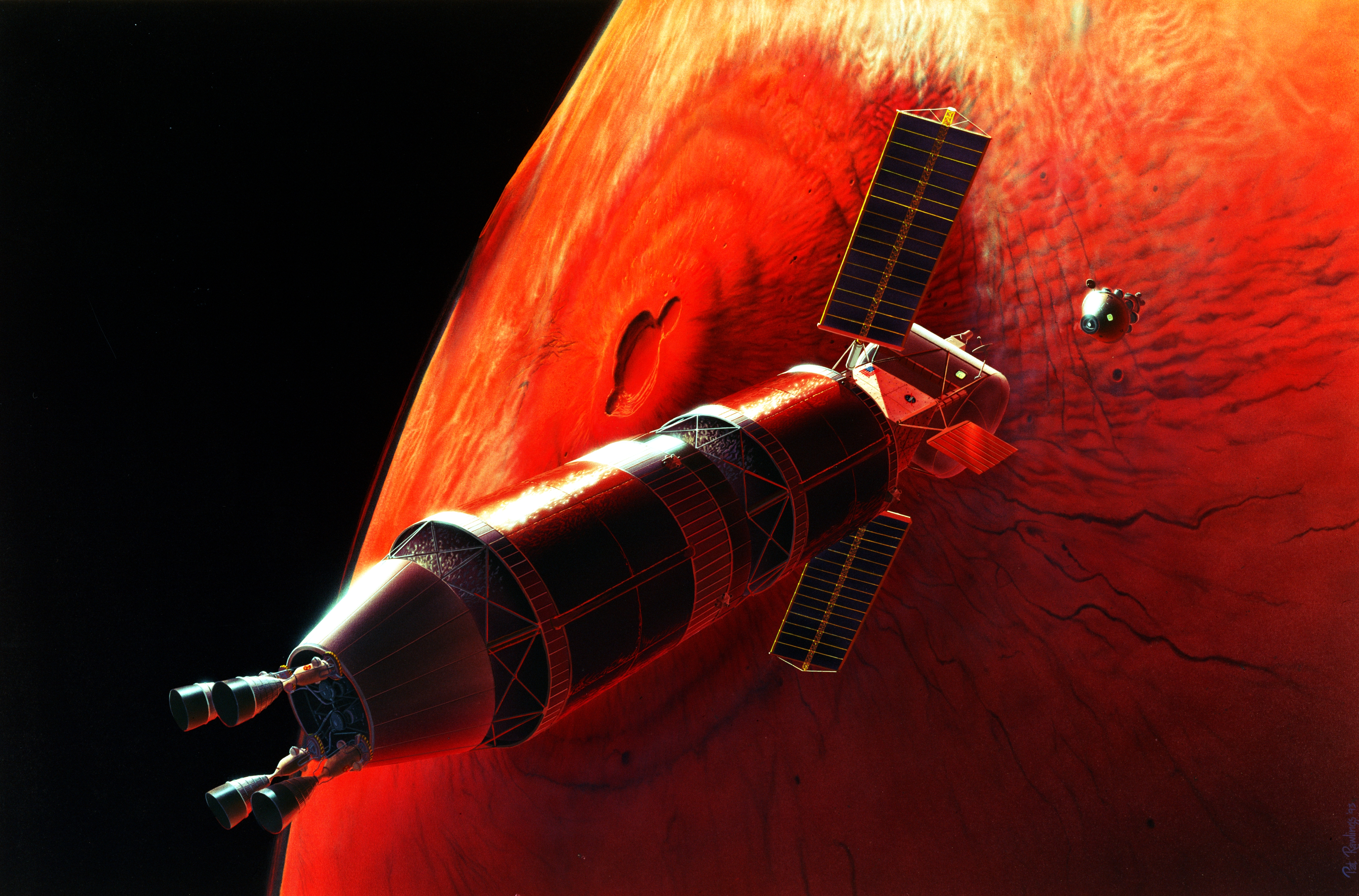
Artist's concept of a Mars orbit rendezvous between a spaceship and the Martian ascent stage

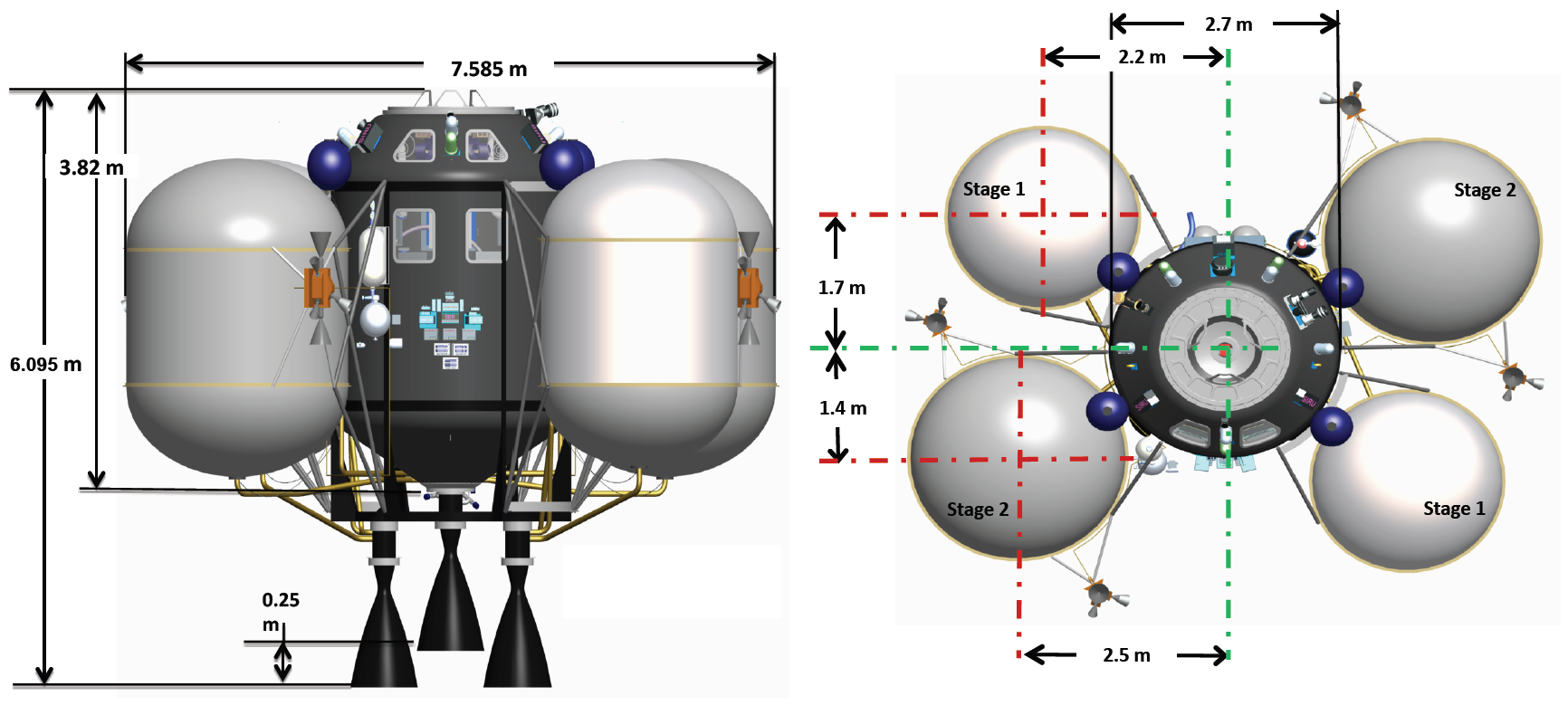
Crewed Mars ascent vehicle from a DRA5 version

Mars orbit rendezvous (MOR) is a space travel concept where two spacecraft meet up and/or dock in Mars orbit.

== Overview ==
For example, one vehicle takes off from Mars, such as a Martian ascent stage, and does a rendezvous in Mars orbit with another spacecraft. Applied to a Mars sample return or human mission to Mars, it allows much less weight to be sent to the surface and back into orbit, because the fuel needed to travel back to Earth is not landed on the planet. It has also been proposed for uncrewed Mars sample return plans.

In one mission proposal, MOR was planned for a Mars Descent-Ascent Vehicle (DAV) and Mars Transit Habitat, where a crew would transfer to the DAV after traveling to Mars on the habitat. This allowed the Mars DAV to be launched separately from the transit habitat, and without any crew.

MOR is analogous to Lunar orbit rendezvous (LOR) used on the United States NASA Apollo program missions to Earth's moon during 1969 to 1972, as opposed to Earth orbit rendezvous (EOR) or Direct ascent.

A related concept is a Mars flyby rendezvous, where spacecraft do not enter orbit but rendezvous near the planet. Mars flyby rendezvous was evaluated at NASA's Manned Spacecraft Center in the 1960s. At that time NASA developed designs for a combination of a Mars lander, short-stay surface habitat, and ascent vehicle called a Mars Excursion Module (MEM); the ascent stage performed the rendezvous. Compared to MOR, a flyby rendezvous means one spacecraft does not have to orbit Mars.

Mars orbit rendezvous was utilized in Austere Human Missions to Mars, a tweak of DRA 5.0.

== See also ==
- Mars Base Camp, a Mars orbiter station
- Human mission to Mars
- Mars cycler
- Space rendezvous
- Mars Excursion Module
- Flyby (spaceflight)
