= Lockheed Martin Lunar Lander =

Concept lunar lander for Artemis program

Mars-Precursor Lunar Lander
- Manufacturer: Lockheed Martin
- Designer: Lockheed Martin
- Country of origin: United States
- Operator: Proposed: Lockheed Martin / NASA
- Applications: Reusable crewed lunar lander

Specifications
- Spacecraft type: Crewed lunar lander
- Launch mass: 62 metric tons
- Dry mass: 22 metric tons
- Payload capacity: 1,000 kg (2,200 lb)
- Crew capacity: 4
- Dimensions: Height: 14 m (46 ft)
- Design life: ≈ 10 flights

Production
- Status: Proposed

Related spacecraft
- Flown with: Proposed: Lunar Gateway

The Lockheed Martin Lunar Lander is a series of design concepts by Lockheed Martin for a crewed lunar lander.

The first proposal, Mars-Precursor Lunar Lander is a reusable crewed lunar lander first unveiled in October 2018, and it is being proposed to NASA for funding and fabrication. NASA specified that it would wait until 2024 to decide the date and method for a crewed lunar lander, and have hinted at seeking a crewed lander no heavier than 6 t (13,000 lb). The reusable lander would enable sustainable lunar surface exploration. The second proposal, revealed on 10 April 2019, is a 2-stage lander proposed to meet Vice President Mike Pence's challenge to return humans to the Moon by 2024, which became the Artemis Program.

Both proposals are based on Orion spacecraft's hardware, and are designed to take astronauts from the Lunar Gateway — a proposed habitat that NASA plans to build in orbit around the Moon — to the lunar surface and advance technology needed to explore Mars.

NASA did not select this design for the Human Landing System component, but Lockheed Martin is providing the ascent portion of the Integrated Lander Vehicle, which was selected as a second HLS provider.

== Overview ==
In 2016, Lockheed Martin announced their architecture concepts for a crewed Mars mission and related vehicles that include the Mars Base Camp (a crewed orbiting Mars station), the Orion spacecraft, and the Mars Ascent/Descent Vehicle (MADV). Lockheed Martin hopes that the lunar activities will help develop precursor infrastructure and experience for a Mars expedition. The crewed lunar lander, if built, would be used to develop the Mars MADV lander. The lunar lander concept was presented in October 2018, and it envisions a single-stage, fully reusable lander system capable of taking off to return to the orbiting Lunar Gateway.

The initial concept would accommodate a crew of four and approximately 1,000 kg (2,200 lb) of cargo payload on the surface for up to two weeks before returning to the Gateway without refueling on the surface. After a surface mission, it would return to the Gateway, where it can be refueled, serviced, and then kept docked to the orbiting Gateway until the next surface mission. Because the Moon lacks an atmosphere, the lander would not have to endure the heat and ablation during atmospheric re-entry, which expands its service time and reduces significantly the labor and costs of refurbishment. Many of its key systems, including the crew pressure vessel, avionics, life support, communications, controls, and navigation systems, were already developed for the new Orion spacecraft.

== Concept of operations ==
The Mars-Precursor Lunar Lander would be a single-stage reusable vehicle able to transport a crew of 4, up to one ton (1,000 kg or 2,200 lb) of usable cargo, and operate for up to 2 weeks on the lunar surface before returning to the lunar orbiting Gateway for refuelling and service. The lander would be able to land anywhere on the Moon, including the lunar poles as well as lower latitude sites on the lunar far side. The vehicle's operational lifetime would be between 4 and 10 flights.

== Preliminary specifications ==
The Mars-Precursor Lunar Lander would be 14 m (46 ft) tall, making it twice as tall as the Apollo Lunar Module used during the Apollo missions. It would have an elevator to get the crew down from the cabin to the surface.

The lander concept envisions the use of the pressure vessel of the Orion spacecraft, and some of Orion's existing systems such as life support, controls, and some avionics, so Lockheed Martin officials think that construction time would be relatively short. Its proposed four engines are a variant of the RL10 that uses the bi-propellant liquid oxygen / liquid hydrogen, generating an estimated impulse (delta-v) of 5 km/s (3.1 mi/s).

== See also ==
- Boeing Lunar Lander
- List of crewed lunar lander designs
