= Mars Excursion Module =

Proposed NASA spacecraft

The Mars Excursion Module (MEM) was a spacecraft proposed by NASA in the 1960s for use in a human mission to Mars, and this can refer to any number of studies by corporations and spaceflight centers for Mars landers. However, primarily a MEM referred to a combination of a Manned Mars lander, short-stay surface habitat, and Mars ascent stage. Variations on a MEM included spacecraft designs like an uncrewed Mars surface cargo delivery, and there was a MEM lander that combined a communications center, living habitat, and laboratory.

A MEM formed part of Mars orbit rendezvous (MOR) and flyby-rendezvous mission profiles studied at NASA's Manned Spacecraft Center in the 1960s. A Mars Excursion Module would have been a combination of a Mars lander, short-stay surface habitat, and ascent vehicle; the ascent stage performed the rendezvous. One design for a MEM would have been used for a 40-day stay on the Martian surface in the flyby-rendezvous mission profile or for a 10- to 40-day stay in the MOR profiles. There was also a descent-only uncrewed MEM for delivering cargo, like a rover to the surface of Mars. Another MEM cargo lander variant would deliver a nuclear reactor to support the surface operations, and there was another with a communications, living quarters and lab in one landing-only MEM unit.

== Proposals ==
=== Philco Aeronutronic MEM ===
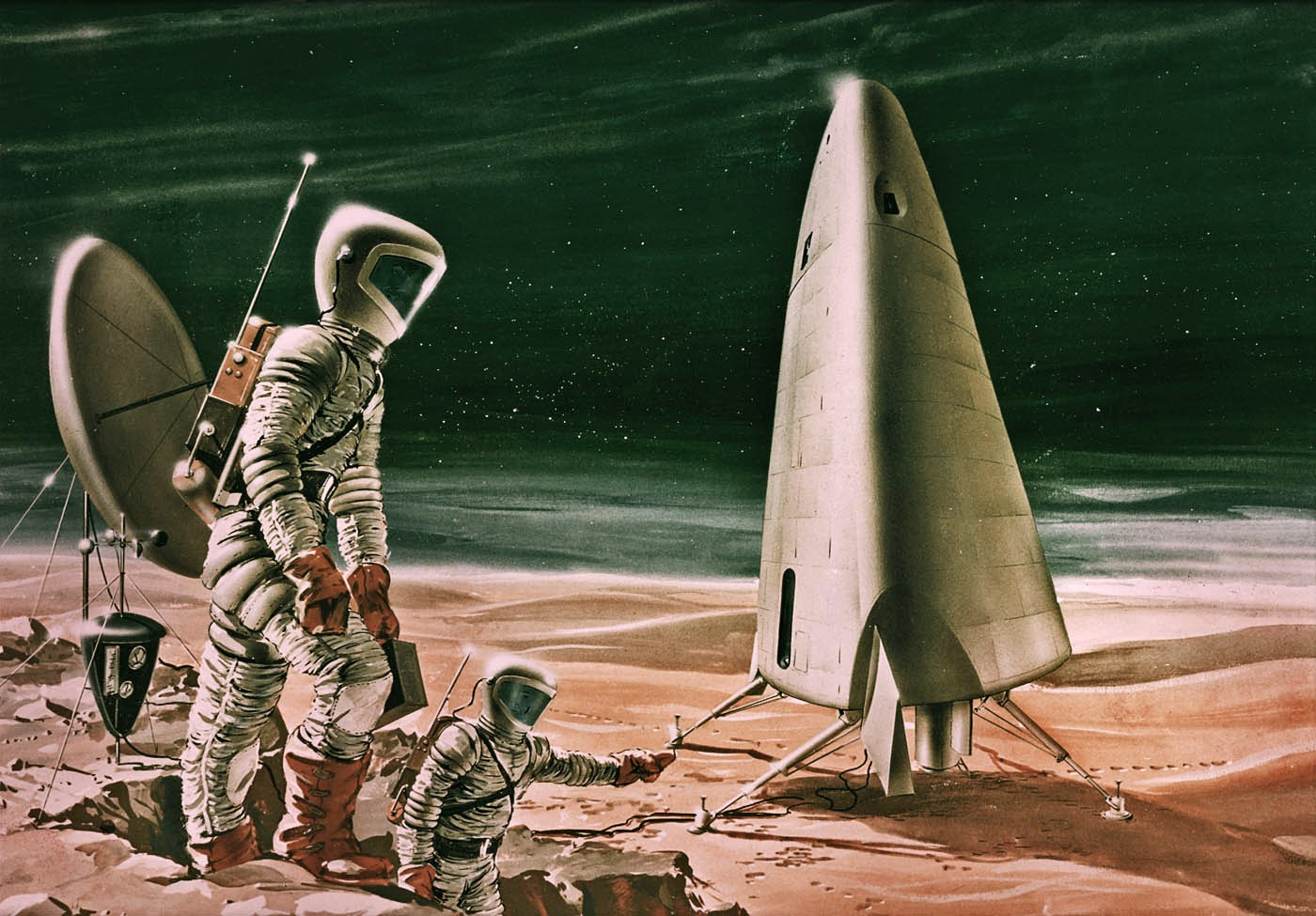
Philco Aeronutronic MEM

In the early 1960s, NASA contracted Philco Corporation to design a Mars Excursion Module for a Mars mission for the early 1970s. The basic requirements were for a crew of two, one US ton of science hardware, and to support 40 days of surface operation on Mars.

In 1964, Philco Aeronutronic proposed a lifting body MEM, approximately 30 feet (9.1 m) long and 33 feet (10 m) wide at the tail, which would carry three astronauts. The hull would have consisted of columbium and nickel alloy. The MEM's descent stage would have served as the launch pad for liftoff of the ascent stage, as with the Apollo Lunar Module.

=== Ames-TRW MEM ===
Another MEM from this period was the Ames contracted TRW MEM, a design which weighed 11.4 metric tons but was designed for Mars atmosphere which had 10% of Earth's density. The TRW MEM would support 10 days on the surface.

=== Project Deimos MEM ===
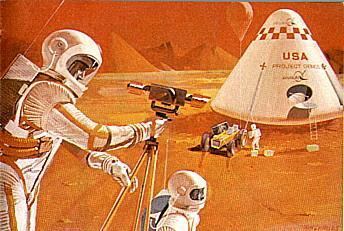
Project Deimos MEM on the surface

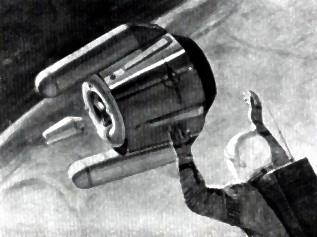
Project Deimos MEM ascent stage and the ROMBUS spacecraft dock in space

Project Deimos was a Mars expedition concept proposed by Philip Bono in 1964, utilizing the ROMBUS single-stage-to-orbit booster. This booster, refueled in Earth orbit, would serve as the propulsion system for the round trip to Mars.

The mission involved separate Mars landers for surface exploration. The Mars-bound vehicle was designed to weigh approximately 3.97 million kg in a 323 km parking orbit, with a trans-Mars injection (TMI) burn scheduled for May 1986. After a 200-day journey, the ROMBUS would enter a 555 km orbit around Mars, with a reduced mass of 984.75 tons after jettisoning empty fuel tanks.

A 25-metric ton Mars Excursion Module (MEM) would land a crew of three astronauts on the Martian surface for a 20-day mission. The crew would return to the mother craft via a Mars ascent vehicle, which would then initiate the return journey to Earth after a 280-day stay in Mars orbit. The total mission duration was 830 days, with the ROMBUS spacecraft landing back on Earth 330 days after departing Mars.

=== Marshall Space Flight Center MEM ===
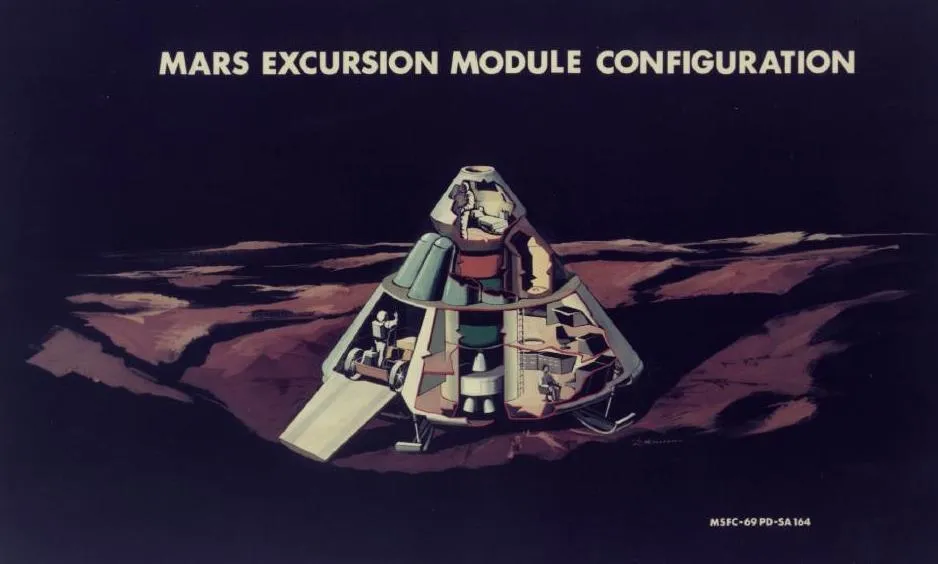
Marshall Space Flight Center MEM

The watershed moment for mission planning was July 1965, when Mariner IV returned more accurate atmospheric data about Mars. This ruled out many of the lifting body and glider designs that were being considered based on estimates of a thicker Mars atmosphere than revealed by Mariner IV.

Gordon Woodcock at the NASA Marshal Space Flight Center worked on the basis of a thinner Mars atmosphere (0.5 percent of Earth's), and developed design for a MEM (a more Apollo-like "gumdrop" style design), and also a pure-lander variant that would deliver a pressurized crewed Mars rover called Molab.

=== Space Task Group MEM ===
A Mars Excursion Module was discussed as a possibility in the Space Task Group Report of 1969, with a development decision required in FY 1974 for a 1981 Mars mission or in FY 1978 for a 1986 mission.

== Cultural impact ==
- "One Way To The Moon", a 1966 episode of The Time Tunnel, featured a Mars Excursion Module launched in 1978. Mars Excursion Modules are also featured in Stephen Baxter's novel Voyage, an alternate history of space exploration in which NASA astronauts land on Mars in 1986 in a MEM named "Challenger" which was based on a North American Rockwell design proposal.
- The 1975 Year Two Space: 1999 episode "The Taybor" features a spacecraft, the SS Emporium, modeled by Martin Bower, which was clearly inspired to the MEM. The spaceship, symbolizing innovation (just like the MEM), was the first spacecraft in the series which could reach FTL velocities thanks to an extraterrestrial "Jump Drive".
- It is probable that the MEM inspired the Ares program Mars Ascent Vehicle (MAV) and Mars Descent Vehicle (MDV) in Andy Weir's 2011 novel The Martian (later adapted into a theatrical film).

== See also ==
- Lander (spacecraft)
- Manned Mars rover
- Mars habitat
- Mars suit
