= Next Space Technologies for Exploration Partnerships =

NASA commercial space initiative

Next Space Technologies for Exploration Partnerships (NextSTEP) is a NASA program using a public-private partnership model that seeks commercial development of deep space exploration capabilities to support more extensive human space flight missions in the Proving Ground around and beyond cislunar space (the space near Earth that extends just beyond the Moon).

== Program overview ==
NextSTEP is a public-private partnership model that seeks commercial development of deep space exploration capabilities to support more extensive human space flight missions in the Proving Ground around and beyond cislunar space—the space near Earth that extends just beyond the Moon.

NASA issued the original NextSTEP Broad Agency Announcement (BAA) to U.S. industry in late 2014, and issued the second NextSTEP BAA in April 2016.

An important part of NASA's strategy is to stimulate the commercial space industry to help the agency achieve its strategic goals and objectives for expanding the frontiers of knowledge, capability, and opportunities in space. A key component of the NextSTEP partnership model is that it provides an opportunity for NASA and industry to partner to develop capabilities that meet NASA human space exploration objectives while also supporting industry commercialization plans.

NASA hopes to incorporate modules and parts developed in the NextSTEP project into the follow on Lunar Gateway and Deep Space Transport projects.

== Phases ==
=== NextSTEP (first selection) ===
In April 2015 the first NextSTEP selection by NASA selected 12 Partnerships to advance concept studies and technology development projects in the areas of advanced propulsion, habitation and small satellites.

Selected advanced electric propulsion projects developed propulsion technology systems in the 50 to 300 kilowatts (67 to 402 hp) range to meet the needs of a variety of deep space mission concepts. The three NextSTEP advanced propulsion projects, $400,000 to $3.5 million per year per award, were limited to a three-year performance period focused on ground testing efforts. The selected companies were:

- Ad Astra Rocket Company of Webster, Texas
- Aerojet Rocketdyne of Redmond, Washington
- MSNW of Redmond, Washington

These selections were intended to augment the Orion capsule with the development of capabilities to initially sustain a crew of four for up to 60 days in cis-lunar space with the ability to scale up to transit habitation capabilities for future Mars missions. The selected projects addressed concepts and, in some cases, provide advancement in technologies related to habitation and operations, or environmental control and life support capabilities of a habitation system. The seven NextSTEP habitat projects had initial performance periods of up to 12 months, at a value of $400,000 to $1 million for the study and development efforts, with the potential for follow-on phases to be defined during the initial phase. The selected companies were:

- Bigelow Aerospace LLC of North Las Vegas, Nevada
- The Boeing Company of Pasadena, Texas
- Dynetics Inc. of Huntsville, Alabama
- Hamilton Sundstrand Space Systems International of Windsor Locks, Connecticut
- Lockheed Martin Space Systems Company of Denver, Colorado
- Orbital ATK of Dulles, Virginia
- Orbital Technologies Corporation of Madison, Wisconsin

The CubeSat projects selected in the award were expected to fly as secondary payload missions on the first flight of the Space Launch System, Artemis 1. CubeSat selections addressed NASA's strategic knowledge gaps reducing risk, increasing effectiveness, and improving the design of robotic and human space exploration.

The two NextSTEP CubeSat projects had fixed-price contracts with technical and payment milestones and total values for the entire development and operations of $1.4 to $7.9 million per award. The selected companies were:

- Lockheed Martin Space Systems Company of Denver, Colorado
- Morehead State University of Morehead, Kentucky

NextSTEP activities were executed through fixed-price contracts with milestone payments, combined with corporate-resource contributions. The selected partner provided overall study and technology development efforts, benefiting NASA and future commercial endeavors.

=== Habitation systems ===
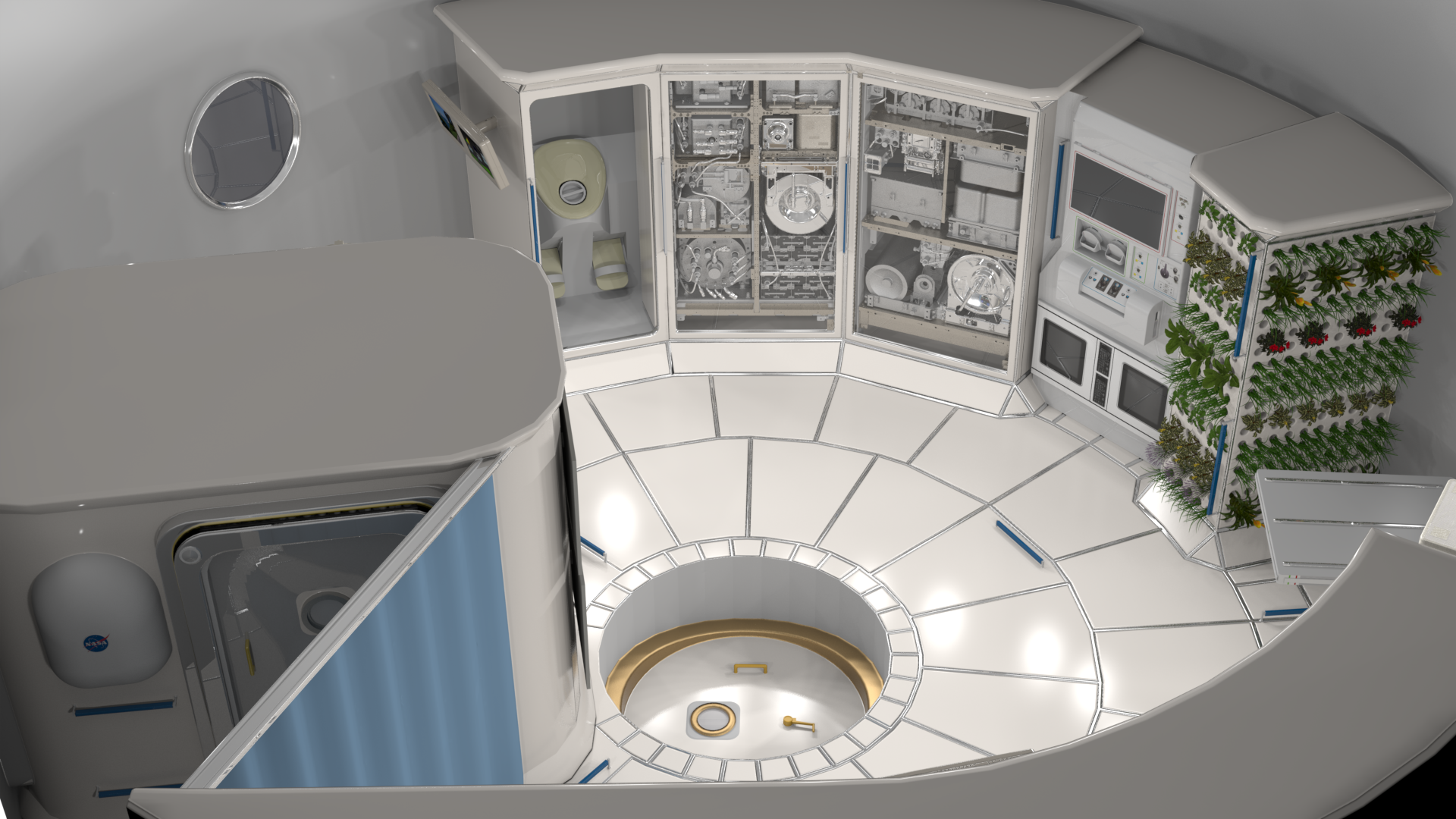
The galley in a space station

Starting in September 2016 under NextSTEP-2 Appendix A six companies were given approximately 24 months to develop ground prototypes or conduct concept studies for a Deep Space Habitat. Habitation systems provide a safe place for humans to live as humans move beyond Earth, especially in the context of the Moon to Mars. The selected companies were:

- Bigelow Aerospace of Las Vegas
- Boeing of Pasadena, Texas
- Lockheed Martin of Denver
- Orbital ATK of Dulles, Virginia
- Sierra Nevada Corporation's Space Systems of Louisville, Colorado
- NanoRacks of Webster, Texas

In August 2016 NASA estimated the combined total of all the awards, covering work in 2016 and 2017, would be approximately $65 million, with additional efforts and funding continuing into 2018. Partners were required to contribute at least 30 percent of the cost of the overall proposed effort.

In January 2018 Sierra Nevada Corporation (SNC) was granted a contract modification permitting the development of advanced bio-based life support and food production systems at SNC's Madison, Wisconsin offices. The aim is to produce plant-based modules that can recycle drinking water from waste water streams, regenerate oxygen from carbon dioxide, produce fresh food for astronauts, and support radiation protection of the crew while on deep exploration missions, such as missions to Mars.

=== ISRU, FabLab ===
In December 2017 NASA issued several sets of announcements, contracts and Space Act Agreements (SAA).

In the first NASA issued a broad agency announcement (BAA) requesting "proposals for trade studies and design, fabrication, and testing of critical components and subsystems for acquisition and processing of extraterrestrial resources into water, oxygen, and fuel". NASA expects to issue multiple fixed price contracts for small amounts in phased approaches for up to 5 years. Cost sharing and/or investment matching will be required.

In the second a total of $10.2 million was awarded over 18 months for development of prototype equipment for use in its FabLab. The machines will perform space based on-demand fabrication. The proposals for development of a first-generation, in-space, multi-material fabrication laboratory (FabLab) for space missions were solicited in May 2017 under Appendix B of the NextSTEP-2 Broad Agency Announcement. The 3 award winners were:

- Interlog Corporation of Anaheim, California
- Techshot Inc. of Greeneville, Indiana
- Tethers Unlimited Inc. of Bothell

=== Human landing systems (Moon) ===
In December 2018 NASA announced that it was issuing a formal request for proposals as Appendix E of NextSTEP-2 allowing American companies to submit bids for the design and development of new reusable systems allowing astronauts to land on the lunar surface. On February 14, 2019, NASA hosted an Industry Forum at NASA HQ to provide an overview of the Human Landing System (HLS) BAA. Project funding of $3.3 billion was requested but by the time an omnibus appropriations bill was passed in December 2020, only $850 million was available.

In April 2019 NASA announced a formal request for proposals for Appendix H of NextSTEP-2 allowing American companies to submit bids for the design and development of the Ascent Element of the Human Landing System (HLS) including the cabin used during landings. This was later extended to cover the entire lander - descent element, ascent element and transfer vehicle.

=== NextSTEP-3 ===
Phase 3 ends with Deployment and Operational Status of Deep Space Habitation and Habitation Systems.

=== Deep Space Transport ===
This project is to develop a vehicle with crewed solar electric propulsion and able to fly to Mars orbit. It is a follow on project using some of the hardware, software and systems developed by NextSTEP. It is currently in the initial planning stage.

== Progress ==
By August 2016, the first phase of NextSTEP had been completed and negotiations with the companies for NextSTEP-2 agreements were started. In March 2017, the proposed development of the Deep Space Transport vehicle was announced.

In August 2017 the Ad Astra Rocket Company reported completing its Year 2 milestones for the VASIMR electric plasma rocket engine. NASA gave approval for Ad Astra to proceed with Year 3 after reviewing completion of a 10-hour cumulative test of the 200SS™ rocket at 100 kW (130 hp).

In March 2019 NASA announced that NextSTEP-2 ground prototypes have been delivered to several of its sites for testing. The prototypes are full size. The fittings include environmental control and life support systems, avionics, sleeping quarters, exercise equipment, and communal areas.

== Funding summary ==
The funding of all Exploration partners for each phase of the NextSTEP program is as follows

Funding Summary (US$)
Round (years)	NextSTEP-1 (2015–2016)	NextSTEP-2 (2016–2018)	-	-	-	Total (2015–2018)
Habitat Contracts
Bigelow Aerospace	745,160	(TBD)	-	-	-	745,160
The Boeing Company	1,003,256	(TBD)	–	–	–	1,003,256
Lockheed Martin	982,039	(TBD)	-	-	–	982,039
Orbital ATK	999,998	(TBD)	-	-	-	999,998
ECLSS Contracts
Dynetics	998,114	0	–	–	–	998,114
Orbital Technologies	600,000	0	–	–	–	600,000
UTC Aerospace Systems	824,829	0	–	–	–	824,829
FabLab
Interlog	0	(TBD)	–	–	–	0
Techshot	0	(TBD)	–	–	–	0
Tethers Unlimited	0	(TBD)	–	–	–	0
Others
Ad Astra Rocket Company	9,000,000	–	–	–	–	9,000,000
(TBD)	0	–	–	–	–	0
Total:	15,153,396	(?)	-	-	-	15,153,396
^{1} The SAA awards were announced but the share of each company was not reported TBD = To Be Determined

== See also ==
- Commercial Orbital Transportation Services
- Commercial Resupply Services
- Commercial Crew Development
- Deep Space Habitat
- Deep Space Transport
- Lunar Gateway
- International Space Station
