= Space Exploration Vehicle =

Conceptual design for pressurized spacecraft

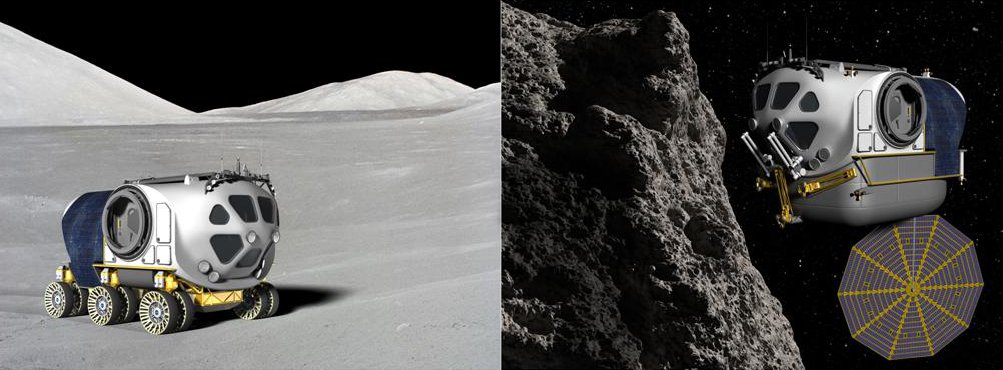
- Artist's concept of the Space Exploration Vehicle as a wheeled rover on the Moon (left) and as a free-flying spacecraft hovering over an asteroid's surface (circa 2011 design)

Overview
- Manufacturer: NASA
- Also called: Lunar Electric Rover

Body and chassis
- Class: Rover
- Doors: 4

Powertrain
- Range: 125 km (78 mi)

Dimensions
- Wheelbase: 4 m (160 in)
- Length: 4.5 m (180 in)
- Height: 3 m (118.1 in)
- Curb weight: 4,000 kg (8,818 lb)

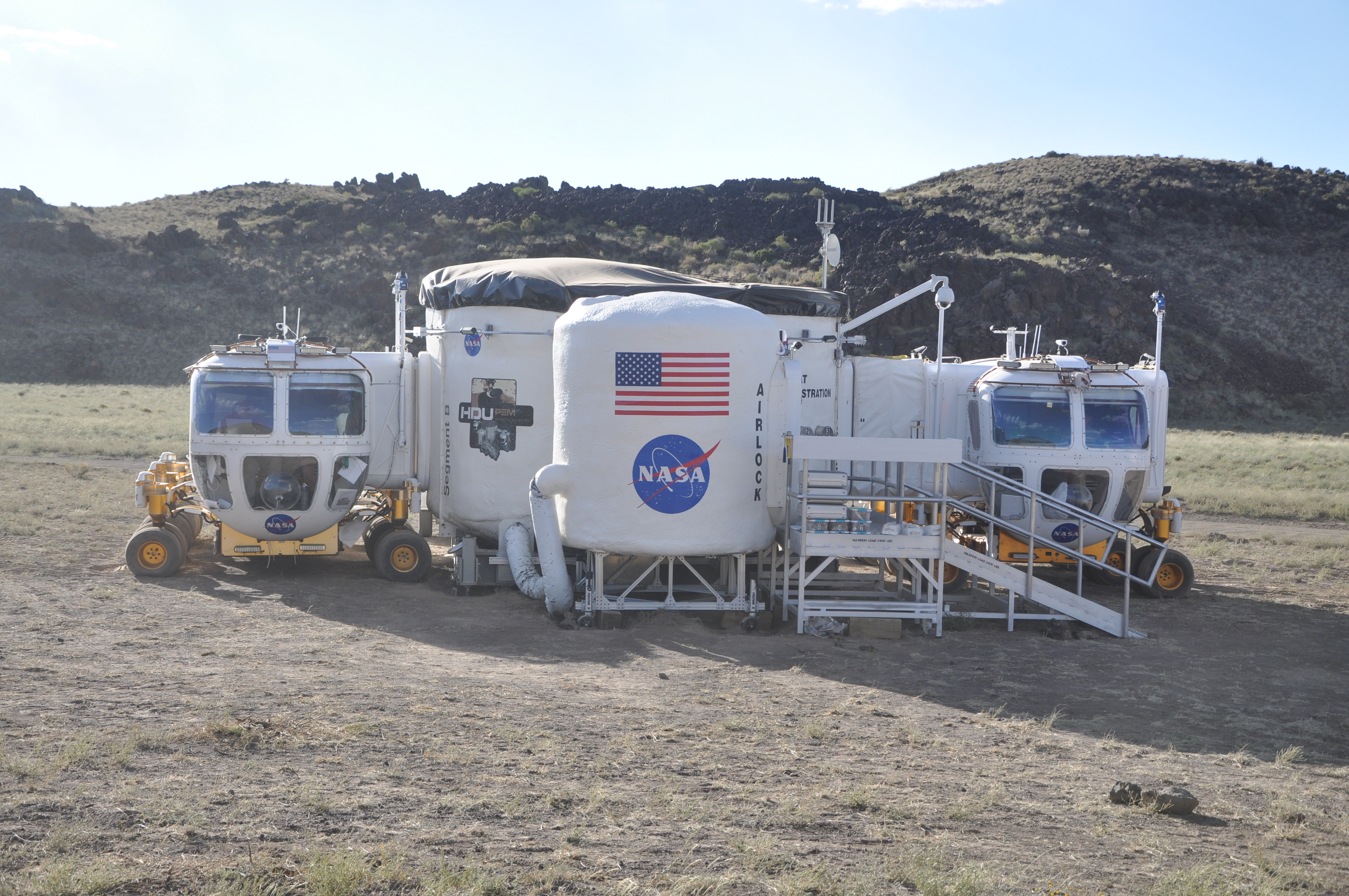
The two rover prototypes docked to the Habitat Demonstration Unit during DesertRATS 2010

The Space Exploration Vehicle (SEV) is a modular vehicle concept developed by NASA from 2008 to 2015. It would have consisted of a pressurized cabin that could be mated either with a wheeled chassis to form a rover for planetary surface exploration (on the Moon and elsewhere) or to a flying platform for open space missions such as servicing satellites and missions to near-Earth asteroids. The concept evolved from the Lunar Electric Rover (LER) concept, which in turn was a development of the Small Pressurized Rover (SPR) concept.

Concept vehicles of the Lunar Electric Rover (and later, the SEV) were tested during the Desert Research and Technology Studies in 2008, 2009, 2010 and 2011. One of the LER concept vehicles took part in the presidential inauguration parade of Barack Obama in 2009. The chassis and structural elements of these concept vehicles were fabricated by Off-Road International. Research and testing continued in 2012 in the Johnson Space Center with a mock-up of a free-flying SEV simulating a mission to an asteroid.

Development of the SEV continued, producing variants called the Multi-Mission Space Exploration Vehicle (MMSEV) and in 2013 a cabin for a possible lunar lander called the Alternate MMSEV (AMMSEV).

The SEV was developed together with other projects under the Advanced Explorations Systems Program. The program's budget for FY 2010 was $152.9 million.

== Features ==
The SEV is the size of a small pickup truck, has 12 wheels, and can house two astronauts for up to two weeks. The SEV consists of a chassis and cabin module. The SEV will allow the attachment of tools such as cranes, cable reels, backhoes and winches. Designed for two occupants, this vehicle is capable of supporting four in an emergency. With wheels that can pivot 360 degrees, the SEV can drive in any direction. Astronauts can enter and exit without space suits directly from an airlock docking hatch, or through a suitport without the need to depressurize the habitat module.

The pressurized module contains a small bathroom with privacy curtains and a shower head producing a water mist for sponge baths. It also contains cabinets for tools, workbench areas and two crew seats that can fold back into beds.

== Specifications (2008 design) ==
- Speed: 10 km/h (6 mph)
- Range: 125 km (78 mi)

=== SEV ===
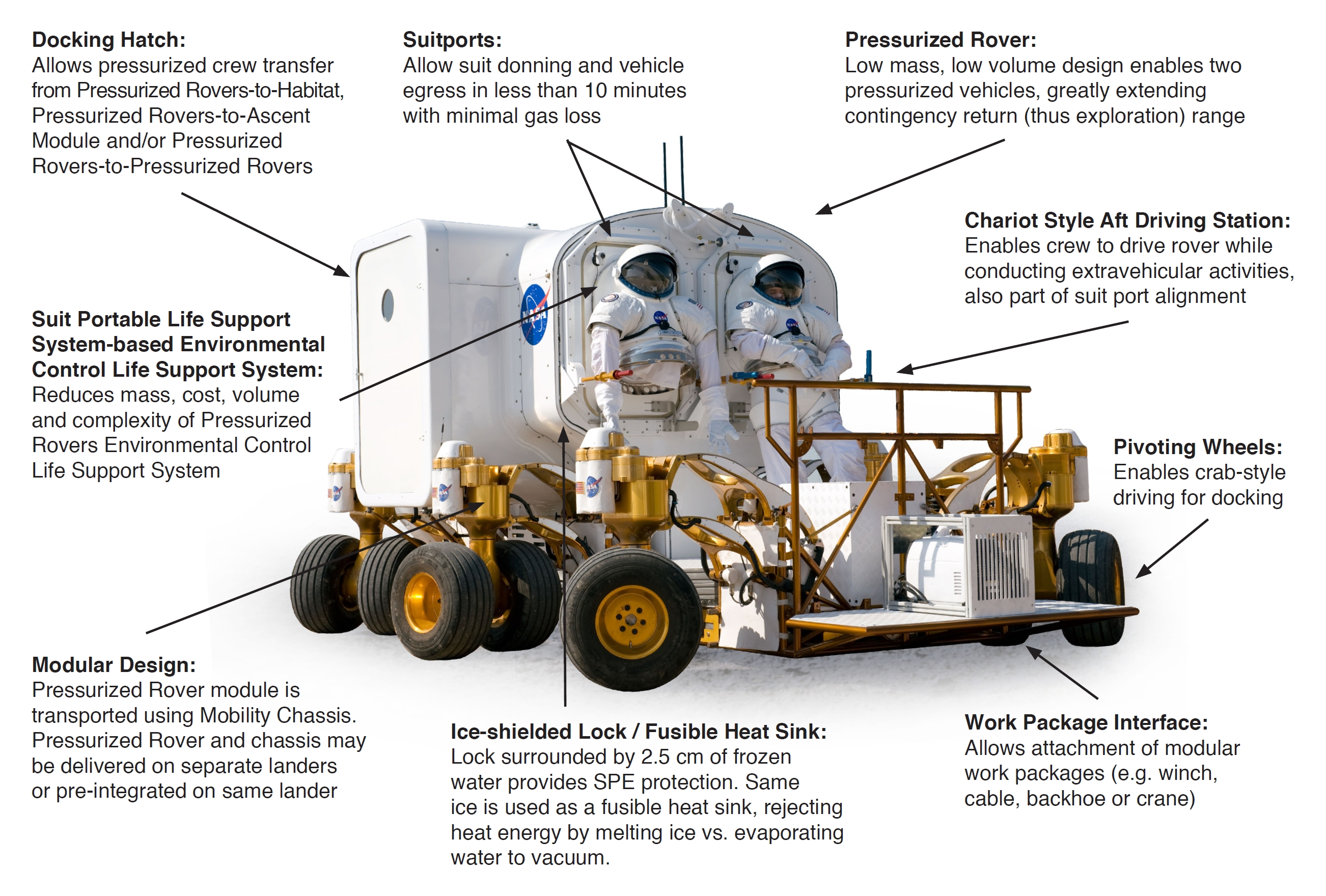
SEV components (2008 design)

- Mass: 3,000 kg (6,614 lb)
- Payload: 1,000 kg (2,205 lb)
- Length: 4.5 m (180 in)
- Wheelbase: 4 m (160 in)
- Height: 3 m (120 in)
- Wheels: 12 wheels with each at 99 cm (39 in) in diameter, 30.5 cm (12.0 in) wide

=== Chassis ===
- Mass: 1,000 kg (2,205 lb)
- Payload: 3,000 kg (6,614 lb)
- Length: 4.5 m (180 in)
- Wheelbase: 4 m (160 in)
- Height: 1.3 m (51 in)
- Wheels: 12 wheels with each at 99 cm (39 in) in diameter, 30.5 cm (12.0 in) wide

== See also ==
- Lunar Roving Vehicle, the 1970s Apollo program Moon rover used on Apollo 15, 16, and 17
- Crewed Mars rover
- Mars habitat
